The reorganization plan of the United States Army is a current modernization (2017–2028) and reorganization (2006–2016) plan of the United States Army that was implemented (2006–2016) under the direction of Brigade Modernization Command.
This effort formally began in 2006 when General Peter Schoomaker (the 35th Army Chief of Staff), was given the support to move the Army from its Cold War divisional orientation to a full-spectrum capability with fully manned, equipped and trained brigades; this effort was completed by the end of 2016. It has been the most comprehensive reorganization since World War II and included modular combat brigades, support brigades, and command headquarters, as well as rebalancing the active and reserve components. The plan was first proposed by the Army's 34th Chief of Staff, Eric Shinseki, in 1999, but was bitterly opposed internally by the Army. 

By 2020, the Army's 40th Chief of Staff was calling for transformational change, rather than incremental change by the Army. In 2021, Gen. McConville, the Army's 40th Chief of Staff, laid out Aimpoint 2035, a direction for the Army to achieve Corps-level Large-scale combat operations (LSCO) by 2035, with Waypoints from 2021 to 2028.
In the fall of 2018, Army Strategy for the next ten years was articulated. The strategy listed four Lines of Effort to be implemented. By 2021, the Army Posture Statement was
People & values
Readiness by 2022
Modernization in the midterm around 2022
Strengthen alliances and partnerships

By 2028, in Multi-Domain Operations (MDO)—as part of the Joint force, Army Strategy is to counter a near-peer adversary which is capable of competition in all domains. In 2019, the planning was for Large Scale ground Combat Operations (LSCO) at echelons above the brigade combat team. Multi-Domain Task Forces (MDTFs) operate in a combatant commander's theater (area of responsibility). MDTFs are experimental brigade-sized units which are tailored to the theater; they are to operate subordinate to a Theater fires command, or to a corps, or division headquarters, jointly or independently, depending on the mission. These MDTFs increase the "capability to connect with national assets" in space and cyber, with "the capacity to penetrate with long range fires, with the ability to integrate all domains". —This is integrated deterrence: taking existing capabilities, as well as building on §new capabilities, which have been deployed in new and networked ways, all tailored to the security landscape of the respective regions, in order to deter the antagonists.

Origin and initial design
Before General Schoomaker's tenure, the Army was organized around large, mostly mechanized divisions, of around 15,000 soldiers each, with the aim of being able to fight two major theatres simultaneously. Under the new plan, the Army would be organized around modular brigades of 3,000–4,000 soldiers each, with the aim of being able to deploy continuously in different parts of the world, and effectively organizing the Army closer to the way it fights. An additional 30,000 soldiers were recruited as a short-term measure to assist in the structural changes, although a permanent end-strength change was not expected because of fears of future funding cuts, forcing the Army to pay for the additional personnel from procurement and readiness accounts. Up to 60% of the defense budget is spent on personnel and an extra 10,000 soldiers would cost US$1.4 billion annually.

On November 22 and 23, 2002, the Belfer Center for Science and International Affairs held the "Belfer Center Conference on Military Transformation". It brought together present and former defense officials and military commanders for the stated purpose of assessing the Department of Defense's progress in achieving a "transformation" of U.S. military capabilities. The conference was held at the Belfer Center at Harvard University's John F. Kennedy School of Government. The United States Army War College and the Dwight D. Eisenhower National Security Series were co-sponsors. In some respects this could be said to have been the birthplace of Transformation as a formal paradigm.

In 2004, the United States Army Forces Command (FORSCOM), which commands most active Army and Army Reserve Component forces based in the Continental United States, was tasked with supervising the modular transformation of its subordinate structure.

In March 2004, a contract was awarded to Anteon Corporation (now part of General Dynamics) to provide Modularity Coordination Cells (MCCs) to each transforming corps, division and brigade within FORSCOM. Each MCC contained a team of functional area specialists who provided direct, ground-level support to the unit. The MCCs were coordinated by the Anteon office in Atlanta, Georgia.

In 2007 a new deployment scheme known as Grow the Army was adopted that enabled the Army to carry out continuous operations.
The plan was modified several times including an expansion of troop numbers in 2007 and changes to the number of modular brigades.
On 25 June 2013, plans were announced to disband 13 modular brigade combat teams (BCTs) and expand the remaining brigades with an extra maneuver battalion, extra fires batteries, and an engineer battalion.

In 2009 an 'ongoing campaign of learning' was the capstone concept for force commanders, meant to carry the Army from 2016 to 2028.
New capabilities
In the summer of 2018, the U.S. Army Futures Command (AFC), a new Army command for modernization was activated. The modernization effort, coordinated with US Army Forces Command (FORSCOM), US Army Materiel Command (AMC), and US Army Training and Doctrine Command (TRADOC), addresses the long lead times for introducing new materiel and capabilities into the brigades of the Army. This planned Joint capability was demonstrated to the Combatant commanders (who are the "customers" for the capability) and the Joint Chiefs (who advise the government on the importance of this effort) at WSMR (White Sands Missile Range) in September 2020, in an ongoing campaign for achieving integrated deterrence. By 2020 Project Convergence, a campaign of learning, was pressed into service at Yuma Proving Ground, in the Army's campaign to modernize, by experimental prototype and demonstration of a networking concept; Project Convergence 2021 (PC21) was then a vehicle for the entire DoD, in its Joint Warfighting Concept (JWC) demonstration of Joint all-domain command and control (JADC2). PC22 (Project Convergence 2022) now has a website for candidate entries, even as PC21 was underway in 2021. Analysis is underway in FY2022 to balance modernization and readiness going forward.

History of "Army Force Generation" (ARFORGEN)
The Secretary of the Army approved implementing "Army Force Generation" (ARFORGEN), a transformational force generation model, in 2006. ARFORGEN process diagram
2010 Army Posture Statement, Addendum F, Army Force Generation (ARFORGEN)

ARFORGEN model concept development began in the summer of 2004 and received its final approval from the Army's senior leadership in early 2006.

FORSCOM, Department of the Army AR 525-29 Military Operations, Army Force Generation, 14 Mar 2011 

In 2016 the Army force generation process ARFORGEN was sidelined because it relied mostly on the Active Army, in favor of the total force policy, which includes the Reserve and National Guard; in the new model, the total force could have fallen to 980,000 by 2018, subject to DoD's Defense Strategic Guidance to the Joint Staff.  By 15 June 2017, the Department of the Army approved an increase in the Active Army's end-strength from 475,000 to 476,000. The total Army end-strength increases to 1.018 million.

Planning process, evolution, and transformation
The commander-in-chief directs the planning process, through guidance to the Army by the Secretary of Defense. Every year, Army Posture Statements by the Secretary of the Army and the Chief of Staff of the Army summarize their assessment of the Army's ability to respond to world events, and also to transform for the future. In support of transformation for the future, TRADOC, upon the advice of the Army's stakeholders, has assembled 20 warfighting challenges. These challenges are under evaluation during annual Army warfighting assessments, such as AWA 17.1, held in October 2016. AWA 17.1 was an assessment by 5,000 US Soldiers, Special Operations Forces, Airmen, and Marines, as well as by British, Australian, Canadian, Danish, and Italian troops. For example, "reach-back" is among the capabilities being assessed; when under attack in an unexpected location, a Soldier on the move might use Warfighter Information Network-Tactical (WIN-T). At the halt, a light Transportable Tactical Command Communications (T2C2 Lite) system could reach back to a mobile command post, to communicate the unexpected situation to higher echelons,
a building block in multi-domain operations.

Implementation and current status
Grow the Army was a transformation and re-stationing initiative of the United States Army which began in 2007 and was scheduled to be completed by fiscal year 2013. The initiative was designed to grow the army by almost 75,000 soldiers, while realigning a large portion of the force in Europe to the continental United States in compliance with the 2005 Base Realignment and Closure suggestions. This grew the force from 42 Brigade Combat Teams (BCTs) and 75 modular support brigades in 2007 to 45 Brigade Combat Teams and 83 modular support brigades by 2013.

On 25 June 2013, 38th Army Chief of Staff General Raymond T. Odierno announced plans to disband 13 brigade combat teams and reduce troop strengths by 80,000 soldiers. While the number of BCTs will be reduced, the size of remaining BCTs will increase, on average, to about 4,500 soldiers. That will be accomplished, in many cases, by moving existing battalions and other assets from existing BCTs into other brigades. Two brigade combat teams in Germany had already been deactivated and a further 10 brigade combat teams slated for deactivation were announced by General Odierno on 25 June. (An additional brigade combat team was announced for deactivation 6 November 2014.) At the same time the maneuver battalions from the disbanded brigades will be used to augment armored and infantry brigade combat teams with a third maneuver battalion and expanded brigades fires capabilities by adding a third battery to the existing fires battalions. Furthermore, all brigade combat teams—armored, infantry and Stryker—will gain a Brigade Engineer Battalion, with "gap-crossing" and route-clearance capability.

On 6 November 2014, it was reported that the 1st Armored Brigade Combat Team, 2nd Infantry Division, currently stationed in South Korea, was to be deactivated in June 2015 and be replaced by a succession of U.S.-based brigade combat teams, which are to be rotated in and out, at the same nine-month tempo as practiced by the Army from 2001 to 2014.

Eleven brigades were inactivated by 2015. The remaining brigades as of 2015 are listed below. On 16 March 2016, the Deputy Commanding General (DCG) of FORSCOM announced that the brigades would now also train to move their equipment to their new surge location as well as to train for the requirements of their next deployment.

By 2018, 23rd Secretary of the Army Mark Esper noted that even though the large deployments to Iraq and Afghanistan had ceased, at any given time, three of the Armored Brigade Combat Teams are deployed to EUCOM, CENTCOM, and INDOPACOM, respectively, while two Infantry Brigade Combat Teams are deployed to Iraq, and Afghanistan, respectively.

In 2019 the 23rd Secretary of the Army asserted that the planning efforts, including Futures Command, the SFABs, and the Decisive Action readiness training of the BCTs are preparing the Army for competition with both near-peer and regional powers. The Army and Marine Corps have issued "clear explanations and guidance for the 429 articles of the Geneva Conventions".

The Budget Control Act could potentially restrict funds by 2020. By the 2024–2025 time frame, the Fiscal Year Development Plan (FYDP) will have reallocated $10 billion more into development of the top 6 modernization priorities, taking those funds from legacy spending budgets.

Reorganization plans by unit type
The Army has now been organized around modular brigades of 3,000–4,000 soldiers each, with the aim of being able to deploy continuously in different parts of the world, and effectively organizing the Army closer to the way it fights. The fact that this modernization is now in place has been acknowledged by the renaming of the 'Brigade Modernization Command' to the "U.S. Army Joint Modernization Command," on 16 February 2017.

By 2021 the Army of 2030 was envisioned to consist of Brigades for the close fight, Divisions for Large scale combat operations, Corps for enduring, sustained operations, and Theater-scale commands.

Modular combat brigades

Modular combat brigades are self-contained combined arms formations. They are standardized formations across the active and reserve components, meaning an Armored BCT at Fort Hood is the same as one at Fort Stewart.

Reconnaissance plays a large role in the new organizational designs. The Army felt the acquisition of the target was the weak link in the chain of finding, fixing, closing with, and destroying the enemy. The Army felt that it had already sufficient lethal platforms to take out the enemy and thus the number of reconnaissance units in each brigade was increased. The brigades sometimes depend on joint fires from the Air Force and Navy to accomplish their mission. As a result, the amount of field artillery has been reduced in the brigade design.

The three types of BCTs are Armored Brigade Combat Teams (ABCTs), Infantry Brigade Combat Teams (IBCTs) (includes Light, Air Assault and Airborne units), and Stryker Brigade Combat Teams (SBCTs).

Armored Brigade Combat Teams, or ABCTs consist of 4,743 troops. This includes the third maneuver battalion as laid out in 2013. The changes announced by the U.S. army on 25 June 2013, include adding a third maneuver battalion to the brigade, a second engineer company to a new Brigade Engineer Battalion, a third battery to the FA battalion, and reducing the size of each battery from 8 to 6 guns. These changes will also increase the number of troops in the affected battalions and also increase the total troops in the brigade. Since the brigade has more organic units, the command structure includes a deputy commander (in addition to the traditional executive officer) and a larger staff capable of working with civil affairs, special operations, psychological operations, air defense, and aviation units. An Armored BCT consists of:
 the brigade headquarters and headquarters company (HHC): 43 officers, 17 warrant officers, 125 enlisted personnel – total: 185 soldiers. 
 the Brigade Engineer Battalion (BEB) (formerly Brigade Special Troops Battalion (BSTB)), consisted of a headquarters company, signal company, military intelligence company with a TUAV platoon and two combat engineer companies (A and B company). The former BSTB fielded 28 officers, 6 warrant officers, 470 enlisted personnel – total: 504 soldiers. Each of the combat engineer company fields 13× M2A2 Bradley Fighting Vehicle (BFV) Operation Desert Storm-Engineer (ODS-E), 1× M113A3 Armored Personnel Carrier (APC), 3× M1150 Assault Breacher Vehicle (ABV), 1× M9 Armored Combat Earthmover (ACE), and 2× M104 Heavy Assault Bridge (HAB).
 a Cavalry (formerly Armed Reconnaissance) Squadron, consisting of a headquarters troop (HHT) and three reconnaissance troops and one armored troop. The HHT fields 2× M3A3 Cavalry Fighting Vehicles (CFVs) and 3× M7A3 Bradley Fire Support Vehicles, while each reconnaissance troop fields 7× M3A3 CFVs. The squadron fields 35 officers and 385 enlisted personnel – total: 424 soldiers.
 three identical combined arms battalions, flagged as a battalion of an infantry, armored or cavalry regiment. Each battalion consists of a headquarters and headquarters company, two tank companies and two mechanized infantry companies. The battalions field 48 officers and 580 enlisted personnel each – total: 628 soldiers. The HHC fields 1× M1A2 main battle tank, 1× M2A3 infantry fighting vehicle, 3× M3A3 cavalry fighting vehicles, 4× M7A3 fire support vehicles and 4× M1064 mortar carriers with M120 120 mm mortars. Each of the two tank companies fields 14× M1A2 main battle tanks, while each mechanized infantry company fields 14× M2A3 infantry fighting vehicles. In 2016, the ABCT's combined arms battalions adopted a triangle structure, of two armored battalions (of two armored companies plus a single mechanized infantry company) plus a mechanized infantry battalion (of two mechanized companies and one armored company). This resulted in the reduction of two mechanized infantry companies; the deleted armored company was reflagged as a troop to the Cavalry Squadron.
 a Field Artillery battalion, consisting of a headquarters battery, two cannon batteries with 8× M109A6 self-propelled 155 mm howitzers each (the changes announced by the U.S. Army on 25 June 2013, include adding a third battery to the FA battalion, and reducing the size of each battery from 8 to 6 guns; these changes also increase the number of troops in the affected battalions and also increase the total troops in the Brigade), and a target acquisition platoon. 24 officers, 2 warrant officers, 296 enlisted personnel – total: 322 soldiers.
 a brigade support battalion (BSB), consisting of a headquarters, medical, distribution and maintenance company, plus six forward support companies, each of which support one of the three combined arms battalions, the cavalry squadron, the engineer battalion and the field artillery battalion. 61 officers, 14 warrant officers, 1,019 enlisted personnel – total: 1,094 soldiers.

Infantry Brigade Combat Team, or IBCTs, comprised around 3,300 soldiers, in the pre-2013 design, which did not include the 3rd maneuver battalion. The 2013 end-strength is now 4,413 Soldiers:
 Special Troops Battalion (now Brigade Engineer Battalion)
 Cavalry Squadron
 (2), later (3) Infantry Battalions
 Field Artillery Battalion
 Brigade Support Battalion

Stryker Brigade Combat Team or SBCTs comprised about 3,900 soldiers, making it the largest of the three combat brigade constructs in the 2006 design, and over 4,500 Soldiers in the 2013 reform.
Its design includes:
 Headquarters Company
 Cavalry Squadron (with three 14-vehicle, two-120 mm mortar reconnaissance troops plus a surveillance troop with UAVs and NBC detection capability)
 (3) Stryker infantry battalions (each with three rifle companies with 12 infantry-carrying vehicles, 3 mobile gun platforms, 2 120 mm mortars, and around 100 infantry dismounts each, plus an HHC with scout, mortar and medical platoons and a sniper section.)
 Engineer Company (folded into the Brigade Engineer Battalion) [An additional engineer company was added to the battalion in the 2013 reform]
 Signal Company (folded into the Brigade Engineer Battalion)
 Military Intelligence Company (with UAV platoon) (folded into the Brigade Engineer Battalion)
 Anti-tank company (9 TOW-equipped Stryker vehicles) (folded into the Brigade Engineer Battalion)
 Field Artillery Battalion (three 6-gun 155 mm Howitzer batteries, target acquisition platoon, and a joint fires cell)
 Brigade Support Battalion (headquarters, medical, maintenance, and distribution companies)

Modular support brigades

Combat support brigades

Similar modularity will exist for support units which fall into five types: Aviation, Fires (artillery), Battlefield Surveillance (intelligence), Maneuver Enhancement (engineers, signal, military police, chemical, and rear-area support), and Sustainment (logistics, medical, transportation, maintenance, etc.). In the past, artillery, combat support, and logistics support only resided at the division level and brigades were assigned those units only on a temporary basis when brigades transformed into "brigade combat teams" for particular deployments.

Combat Aviation Brigades are multi-functional, offering a combination of attack helicopters (i.e., Apache), reconnaissance helicopters (i.e., Kiowa), medium-lift helicopters (i.e., Blackhawks), heavy-lift helicopters (i.e., Chinooks), and medical evacuation (MEDEVAC) capability. Aviation will not be organic to combat brigades. It will continue to reside at the division-level due to resource constraints.

Heavy divisions (of which there are six) will have 48 Apaches, 38 Blackhawks, 12 Chinooks, and 12 Medevac helicopters in their aviation brigade. These are divided into two aviation attack battalions, an assault lift battalion, a general aviation support battalion. An aviation support battalion will have headquarters, refuelling/resupply, repair/maintenance, and communications companies. Light divisions will have aviation brigades with 60 armed reconnaissance helicopters and no Apaches, with the remaining structure the same. The remaining divisions will have aviation brigades with 30 armed reconnaissance helicopters and 24 Apaches, with the remaining structure the same. Ten Army Apache helicopter units will convert to heavy attack reconnaissance squadrons, with 12 RQ-7B Shadow drones apiece. The helicopters to fill out these large, combined-arms division-level aviation brigades comes from aviation units that used to reside at the corps-level.

Field Artillery Brigades (formerly known as "Fires Brigades" prior to 2014) provide traditional artillery fire (Paladin Howitzer, M270 MLRS, HIMARS) as well as information operations and non-lethal effects capabilities. After the 2013 reform, the expertise formerly embodied in the pre-2007 Division Artillery (DIVARTY) was formally re-instituted in the Division Artillery Brigades of 2015. The operational Fires battalions will now report to this new formulation of DIVARTY, for training and operational Fires standards, as well as to the BCT.

Air Defense: The Army will no longer provide an organic air defense artillery (ADA) battalion to its divisions. Nine of the ten active component (AC) divisional ADA battalions and two of the eight reserve (ARNG) divisional ADA battalions will deactivate. The remaining AC divisional ADA battalion along with six ARNG divisional ADA battalions will be pooled at the Unit of Employment to provide on-call air and missile defense (AMD) protection. The pool of Army AMD resources will address operational requirements in a tailorable and timely manner without stripping assigned AMD capability from other missions. Maneuver short-range air defense (MSHORAD) with laser cannon prototypes are fielding by 2020.

Maneuver Enhancement Brigades are designed to be self-contained, and will command units such as chemical, military police, civil affairs units, and tactical units such as a maneuver infantry battalion. These formations are designed to be joint so that they can operate with coalition, or joint forces such as the Marine Corps, or can span the gap between modular combat brigades and other modular support brigades.

Sustainment Brigades provide echelon-above-brigade-level logistics. On its rotation to South Korea, 3rd ABCT, 1st Armored Division deployed its supply support activity (SSA) common authorized stockage list (CASL) as well. The CASL allows the ABCT to draw additional stocks beyond its pipeline of materiel from GCSS-A. The DoD-level Global Combat Support System includes an Army-level tool (GCSS-A), which runs on tablet computers with bar code readers which 92-A specialists use to enter and track materiel requests, as the materiel makes its way through the supply chain to the brigades. This additional information can then be used by GCSS-A to trigger resupply for Army pre-positioned stocks, typically by sea. The data in GCSS-Army is displayed on the Commander's Dashboard —Army Readiness-Common Operating Picture (AR-COP). This dashboard is also available to the Commander at BCT, division, corps, and Army levels.

The former Battlefield Surveillance Brigades, now denoted Military Intelligence Brigades (Expeditionary), will offer additional UAVs and long-term surveillance detachments. Each of the three active duty brigades is attached to an Army Corps.

Security Force Assistance Brigades
Security force assistance brigades (SFABs) are brigades whose mission is to train, advise, and assist (TAA) the armed forces of other states. The SFAB are neither bound by conventional decisive operations nor counter-insurgency operations. Operationally, a 500-soldier SFAB would free-up a 4500-soldier BCT from a TAA mission.
On 23 June 2016 General Mark Milley revealed plans for train/advise/assist Brigades, consisting of seasoned officers and NCOs with a full chain of command, but no junior Soldiers. In the event of a national emergency the end-strengths of the SFABs could be augmented with new soldiers from basic training and advanced individual training.

An SFAB was projected to consist of 500 senior officers and NCOs, which, the Army says, could act as a cadre to reform a full BCT in a matter of months. In May 2017, the initial SFAB staffing of 529 soldiers was underway, including 360 officers. The officers will have had previous command experience. Commanders and leaders will have previously led BCTs at the same echelon. The remaining personnel, all senior NCOs, are to be recruited from across the Army. Promotable E-4s who volunteer for the SFAB are automatically promoted to Sergeant upon completion of the Military Advisor Training Academy. A team of twelve soldiers would include a medic, personnel for intelligence support, and air support, as cited by Keller.

These SFABs would be trained in languages, how to work with interpreters, and equipped with the latest equipment such as Integrated Tactical Network (ITN) using T2C2 systems including secure, but unclassified, communications and weapons to support coalition partners, as well as unmanned aircraft systems (UASs). The first five SFABs would align with the Combatant Commands (SOUTHCOM, AFRICOM, CENTCOM, EUCOM, and USINDOPACOM, respectively); an SFAB could provide up to 58 teams (possibly with additional Soldiers for force protection).

Funding for the first two SFABs was secured in June 2017. By October 2017, the first of six planned SFABs (the 1st Security Force Assistance Brigade) was established at Fort Benning.
On 16 October 2017, BG Brian Mennes of Force Management in the Army's G3/5/7 announced accelerated deployment of the first two SFABs, possibly by Spring 2018 to Afghanistan and Iraq, if required. This was approved in early July 2017, by the 27th Secretary of Defense and the 39th Chief of Staff of the Army. On 8 February 2018, 1st SFAB held an activation ceremony at Fort Benning, revealing its colors and heraldry for the first time, and then cased its colors for the deployment to Afghanistan. 1st Security Force Assistance Brigade deployed to Afghanistan in Spring 2018.

On 8 December 2017, the Army announced the activation of the 2nd Security Force Assistance Brigade, for January 2018, the second of six planned SFABs. The SFAB are to consist of about 800 senior and noncommissioned officers who have served at the same echelon, with proven expertise in advise-and-assist operations with foreign security forces. Fort Bragg was chosen as the station for the second SFAB in anticipation of the time projected to train a Security Force Assistance Brigade. On 17 January 2018 39th Chief of Staff Mark Milley announced the activation of the third SFAB. 2nd SFAB undergoes three months of training beginning October 2018, to be followed by a Joint Readiness Training Center Rotation beginning January 2019, and deployment in spring 2019. The 3rd, 4th, and 5th SFABs are to be stationed at Fort Hood, Fort Carson, and Joint Base Lewis-McChord, respectively; the headquarters of the 54th Security Force Assistance Brigade, made up from the Army National Guard, will be in Indiana, one of six states to contribute an element of 54th SFAB. It is likely that these brigades will be seeing service within United States Central Command.

The Security Force Assistance Command (SFAC), a one-star division-level command and all six SFABs will be activated by 2020. The Security Force Assistance Directorate, a one-star Directorate for the SFABs, will be part of FORSCOM in Fort Bragg. SFAD will be responsible for the Military Advisor Training Academy as well.
The 1st SFAB commander was promoted to Brigadier General in Gardez, Afghanistan on 18 August 2018. The 2nd SFAB commander was promoted to Brigadier General 7 September 2018. SFAC and 2nd SFAB were activated in a joint ceremony at Fort Bragg on 3 December 2018. 2nd SFAB deployed to Afghanistan in February 2019. 3rd SFAB activated at Fort Hood on 16 July 2019; 3rd SFAB will relieve 2nd SFAB in Afghanistan for the Winter 2019 rotation.

Security Assistance is part of The Army Strategy 2018's Line of Effort 4: "Strengthen Alliances and Partnerships". The Security Assistance Command is based at Redstone Arsenal (but the SFAC is based at Fort Bragg).

Army Field Support Brigades
Army Field Support Brigades (AFSBs) have been utilized to field materiel in multiple Combatant Command's Areas of Responsibility (AORs).
 Initially 405th AFSB prepositioned stocks for a partial brigade; eventually, the 405th was to field materiel for an ABCT, a Division headquarters, a Fires Brigade, and a Sustainment Brigade in their AOR, which required multinational agreements. Similarly, 401st AFSB configured materiel for an ABCT in their AOR as well. The objective has been combat configuration: maintain their vehicles to support a 96-hour readiness window for a deployed ABCT on demand. In addition, 403rd Army Field Support Brigade maintains prepositioned stocks for their AOR.

Command headquarters
Below the Combatant Commands echelon, Division commands will command and control their combat and support brigades. Divisions will operate as plug-and-play headquarters commands (similar to corps) instead of fixed formations with permanently assigned units. Any combination of brigades may be allocated to a division command for a particular mission, up to a maximum of four combat brigades. For instance, the 3rd Infantry Division headquarters could be assigned two armor brigades and two infantry brigades based on the expected requirements of a given mission. On its next deployment, the same division may have one Stryker brigade and two armor brigades assigned to it. The same modus operandi holds true for support units. The goal of reorganization with regard to logistics is to streamline the logistics command structure so that combat service support can fulfill its support mission more efficiently.

The division headquarters itself has also been redesigned as a modular unit that can be assigned an array of units and serve in many different operational environments. The new term for this headquarters is the UEx (or Unit of Employment, X). The headquarters is designed to be able to operate as part of a joint force, command joint forces with augmentation, and command at the operational level of warfare (not just the tactical level). It will include organic security personnel and signal capability plus liaison elements. As of March 2015, nine of the ten regular Army division headquarters, and two national guard division headquarters are committed in support of Combatant Commands.

When not deployed, the division will have responsibility for the training and readiness of a certain number of modular brigades units. For instance, the 3rd Infantry Division headquarters module based at Fort Stewart, GA is responsible for the readiness of its combat brigades and other units of the division (that is, 3rd ID is responsible for administrative control —ADCON of its downtrace units), assuming they have not been deployed separately under a different division.

The re-designed headquarters module comprises around 1,000 soldiers including over 200 officers. It includes:
 A Main Command Post where mission planning and analysis are conducted
 A mobile command group for commanding while on the move
 (2) Tactical Command Posts to exercise control of brigades
 Liaison elements
 A special troops battalion with a security company and signal company

Divisions will continue to be commanded by major generals, unless coalition requirements require otherwise. Regional army commands (e.g. 3rd Army, 7th Army, 8th Army) will remain in use in the future but with changes to the organization of their headquarters designed to make the commands more integrated and relevant in the structure of the reorganized Army, as the chain of command for a deployed division headquarters now runs directly to an Army service component command (ASCC), or to FORSCOM.

In January 2017, examples of pared-down tactical operations centers, suitable for brigades and divisions, were demonstrated at a command post huddle at Fort Bliss. The huddle of the commanders of FORSCOM, United States Army Reserve Command, First Army, I and III Corps, 9 of the Active Army divisions, and other formations discussed standardized solutions for streamlining command posts. The Army is paring-down the tactical operations centers, and making them more agile, to increase their survivability.
By July 2019 battalion command posts have demonstrated jump times of just over 3 hours, at the combat training centers, repeated 90 to 120 times in a rotation. The C5ISR center of CCDC ran a series of experiments (Network Modernization Experiment 2020 — NetModX 20) whether using LTE for connecting nodes in a distributed Command post environment was feasible, from July to October 2020.

Four major commands

United States Army Futures Command (AFC), grew from 12 people ("a small agile command") at headquarters in 2018 to 24,000 in 25 states and 15 countries in 2019. Futures Command was slated to be the Army's fourth Army command (ACOM). AFC joined the other Army commands FORSCOM, Army Materiel Command (AMC), and TRADOC as four-star commands. Austin, Texas became the station for the headquarters of Futures Command. Initial operating capability is slated for 2018.
Although the Army has enjoyed overmatch for the past seventy years, more rapid modernization for conflict with near-peers is the reason for AFC, which will be focused on achieving clear overmatch in six areas — long-range precision fires, next-generation combat vehicle, future vertical lift platforms, a mobile & expeditionary Army network, air & missile defense capabilities, and soldier lethality (i.e. artillery, armor, aviation, signal, air defense artillery, and infantry respectively see: Futures).

In a reform-oriented break with Army custom, leaders of AFC headquarters were to locate in a downtown property of the University of Texas System, while project-driven soldiers and Army civilians were to co-locate with entrepreneurs/innovators in tech hubs, in the vision of Under Secretary of the Army Ryan D. McCarthy.
The official activation ceremony of AFC was on 24 August 2018, in Austin, Texas; in a press conference on that day featuring Army Chief of Staff Milley, Secretary Esper, Mayor Adler, and AFC commander Murray, Chief Milley noted that AFC was to actively reach out into the community in order to learn, and that Senator John McCain's frank criticism of the acquisition process was instrumental for modernization reform at Futures command. In fact, AFC soldiers were to blend into Austin by not wearing their uniforms [to work side by side with civilians in the tech hubs], Milley noted in the 24 August 2018 press conference. Secretary Esper said he expected failures during the process of learning how to reform the acquisition and modernization process.

The organizational design of AFC was informed by the cancellation of the Army's Future Combat Systems project. Under Secretary of the Army Ryan D. McCarthy reviewed the reasons for that cancellation. Thus "unity of command and purpose" was a criterion for the design by unifying previous modernization efforts in a single command; the sub-goals would be met in do-able chunks. The ratio of uniformed personnel to Army civilian employees is expected to be a talent-based, task-based issue for the AFC commander.The expectation is that these reforms will enable cultural change across the entire Army, as a part of attaining full operational capability.
The Program Executive Offices (PEOs) of ASA (ALT) will have a dotted-line relationship with Futures Command.

In order to separate Army modernization from today's requirement for readiness, eight cross-functional teams (CFTs) were transferred from the other three major commands to Futures Command. United States Army Research, Development and Engineering Command and the United States Army Capabilities Integration Center will report to the new command. ATEC retains its direct reporting relationship to the Chief of Staff of the Army.

The first tranche of transfers into AFC included: Capabilities Integration Center (ARCIC), Capability Development and Integration Directorates (CDIDs), and TRADOC Analysis Center (TRAC) from TRADOC, and RDECOM (including the six research, development and engineering centers (RDECs), and the U.S. Army Research Laboratory (ARL)), and Army Materiel Systems Analysis Activity (AMSAA), from AMC, as announced by Secretary Esper on 4 June 2018. TRADOC's new role is amended accordingly. The Principal Military Deputy to the ASA(ALT) was also to become deputy commanding general for Combat Systems, Army Futures Command, while leading the PEOs; he has directed each PEO who does not have a CFT to coordinate with, to immediately form one, at least informally.
General Murray has announced that AFC intends to be a global command, in its search for disruptive technologies.
39th Army Chief of Staff Milley was looking for AFC to attain full operational capability (FOC) by August 2019, a goal since met.

As this modernized materiel is fielded to the brigades, the scheme is to equip the units with the highest levels of readiness for deployment with upgraded equipment earliest, while continuing to train the remaining units to attain their full mission capability. Note that expertise, in say psychological operations, is not necessarily confined to the Active Army brigades; if some operation were to require the expertise of a National Guard unit for example, an echelon above brigade might require that a unit with the most modern materiel be formed, to utilize that expertise.
The 10 Active Army divisions each have a deployable 3D printer for immediate operational requirements (to replace damaged materiel, subject to Army directives).

By 2020, in the Fiscal Year 2021 budget request to Congress, the Army Acquisition Executive (AAE) was able to report progress in the partnership between Army Futures Command (viz. its CFTs) and his PEOs in ASA(ALT) —the office of Assistant Secretary of the Army (Acquisition, Logistics & Technology).

Multi-domain operations (MDO)

In 2017, the concept of multi-domain battle (MDB) had emerged from TRADOC, for which the Army sought joint approval from the other services; instead, the Air Force recommended multi-domain operations (MDO) as the operating concept.

Multi-domain operations cover integrated operation of cyberspace, space (meaning satellite operations, from the Army's perspective), land, maritime, and air. A multi-domain task force was stood up in 2018 in I Corps for the Pacific, built around 17th Field Artillery Brigade. MDO in the Pacific has to involve maritime operations; MDO is planned for EUCOM in 2020. Multi-domain battalions, first stood up in 2019, comprise a single unit for air, land, space, and cyber domains to ensure integration of cyber/EW, space, and information operations in more levels of command. 

 By 2020 the Army's programs for modernization were now framed as a decades-long process of cooperation with allies and partners, for competition with potential adversaries who historically have blurred the distinction between peace and war, and who have been operating within the continuum (the gray zone) between peace, cooperation, competition, crisis, and conflict instead. When meeting a crisis, the Army's preference is deterrence. The need for deterrence against ballistic missiles is shifting to the need to deter or defend against attack by hypersonic weapons.

Conflict

Deterrence
In the decade from 2009 to 2019 the Army was transitioning its brigade-based counterinsurgency effort to modernization of the echelons above brigade; by 2021 integrated deterrence (a campaign operating across domains, by a single commander to meet the objective of the Joint and Allied Force —the concept is scalable, assigning one objective per task force commander) against possible adversaries was underway, as part of the Joint force's campaign of learning.

TRADOC designed exercises for Joint warfighter assessments —JWA 19, at Fort Lewis, to clarify the jumps for Command Posts, to ensure their survivability during future operations.
In 2019, there was a new focus on planning for large-scale ground combat operations (LSCO), "that will require echelons above brigade, all of which will solve unique and distinct problems that a given BCT can't solve by itself."— LTG Eric Wesley.
 Computer simulations (DOTMLPF), of the survivability rates for the units, were then compared with the interaction strategies, tactics and operations of JWA 19, a highly contested environment. JWA 19 occurred at multiple operational speeds, in multiple domains served by multiple services (cyber: operating in milliseconds; air: operations at 500 miles per hour; maritime: 30 knots; and ground: 2 miles per hour). JWA 19 involved the militaries of the US, the United Kingdom, New Zealand, Canada, France, Australia and Singapore. 

The first CG of Futures Command (AFC) has noted that MDO will tie together the initiatives of AFC; but failures are to be expected in the AFC initiatives, and the institutional response of the Army, which is traditionally risk-averse, will test how committed the nation is to Army reforms.

Mesh networking is in play for the Mobile, Expeditionary Network: In Fiscal Year 2019, the network CFT, PEO 3CT, and PEO Soldier leveraged Network Integration Evaluation 18.2 for experiments with brigade level scalability. Among the takeaways was to avoid overspecifying the requirements (in ITN Information Systems Initial Capabilities Document) to meet operational needs, such as interoperability with other networks. ITN —Integrated Tactical Network is being fielded to four brigades in 2021. Up through 2028, every two years the Army will insert new capability sets for ITN (Capability sets '21, '23, '25, etc.).

 On 25 September 2020 Army Chief of Staff Gen. James C. McConville discussed the combination of Multi-domain operations (MDO) and Joint All-Domain Command and Control (JADC2) with Air Force Chief of Staff Gen. Charles Q. Brown.
On 2 October 2020 the Chief of Staff of the Army and the Chief of Staff of the Air Force signed a Memorandum of understanding (MOU) on Combined Joint All-Domain Command and Control (CJADC2) of the two services, a two-year agreement. Their staffs met again after 60 days to show their progress on connecting the Army's Project Convergence and the Air Force's ABMS into a data fabric in 2021.

Competition
"The competition phase is about deterring war". —Sydney J. Freedberg, Jr.
In September and November 2019 the Department of Defense (DoD) "scheduled a series of globally integrated exercises with participation from across the US government interagency to refine our plans" —19th Chairman of the Joint Chiefs of Staff Joseph Dunford. This exercise was designed to help 27th Secretary of Defense Mark Esper develop new plans, in the face of a change in chairmanship of the Joint Chiefs of Staff. Specifically what was missing in 2019 was a joint concept shared at the appropriate operational speed between the several domains, among the respective services, when fighting a peer adversary. —LTG Eric Wesley Note the referenced LRHW graphic depicting a 2019 scenario—
 This is a return to the use of echelons above brigade (Divisions, Corps, and Field Armies), with specific tasks to force current adversaries to return to competition, rather than continue conflict; kill chains were formed within seconds, by live-fire demonstration, as of September 2020. 

In the Army of 2030 a division would be the Unit of Action, rather than a brigade. Artillery, engineer, and intelligence units would mass at the division echelon; brigades would become smaller to become more maneuverable. A corps would sustain the brigades' endurance for the longer fight; the higher echelons (field army, corps, and division) would gain the resources they would need for the duration of an operation.

By 2021 the Department of Defense could train for crises using capabilities it had developed jointly among its military departments, using concepts it had settled upon experimentally, beginning in 2019:

 Note: the following training scenario, to gain relative advantage, is only one of the possible paths suggested by following the 5 red numbered bullet points in the illustration.

 Competition— No overt hostilities are yet detected. Blue bar (force projection) is in standoff against red bar (threat).
 Strategic Support area— National assets (blue) detect breaching of standoff by adversary (in red).
 Close area support— blue assets hand-off to the combatant commands, who are to create effects visible to the adversary (in red).
 Deep maneuver— blue combatant actions dis-integrate adversary efforts (per TRADOC pamphlet 525-3-1: "militarily compete, penetrate, dis-integrate, and exploit" the adversary); —Operational and Strategic deep fires create effects on the adversary. Adversary is further subject to defeat in detail, until adversaries perceive they are overmatched (no more red assets to expend).
 Adversary retreats to standoff. The populations perceive that the adversary is defeated, for now. (Compare to Perkins' cycle, 'return to competition', in which deterrence has succeeded in avoiding a total war, in favor of pushing an adversary back to standoff (the red threat bar). Blue force projection still has overmatched red threat.)

In 2019 the 27th Secretary of Defense ordered the four services and the Joint staff to create a new joint warfighting concept for All-domain operations (ADO), operating simultaneously in the air, land, sea, space, cyber, and the electromagnetic spectrum (EMS). In 2021 the 28th Secretary of Defense approved the Joint warfighting concept (JWC), which remains classified.

The 20th CJCS has allocated roles to each of the services in concept development for Joint All-Domain Operations (JADO);
the Air Force takes the lead for command and control (C2). The Joint services each have a C2 concept to be scaled —for the Army, C2 requires thousands of connections with the sensors and shooters, as compared with hundreds of connections with the sensors and shooters for the Air Force ABMS (Advanced Battle Management System);
 the Navy will lead concept development in Joint fires: its newest equipment (the newer Littoral Combat Ships, the MQ-8C, and the Naval Strike Missile) provides standoff for the Navy against its near-peers. In February 2020, voices at the tactical level were supporting cross-domain, cross-role, cross-service interoperation: "Any sensor should be able to link to any shooter and any command and control node". The combination of F-35-based targeting coordinates, Long range precision fires, and Low-earth-orbit satellite capability overmatches the competition, according to Lt. Gen. Eric Wesley. A Space sensor layer of satellites (at 1200 miles above earth) would position hundreds of Low-earth-orbit sensors for tracking hypersonic vehicles. This tracking layer would provide guidance information to the interceptors in the missile defense system.
 the Army will lead concept development for contested logistics.

 the service to lead concept development in 'Information advantage' is not yet determined by the Joint Staff J-7 as of 16 September 2020. Build a kill chain faster than the adversary's OODA loop. See Fog of war AI is one such initiative.
By 11 August 2021, the Joint requirements oversight council (JROC) identified a 5th functional capability— Integrated air and missile defense (IAMD). JROC will now issue a directive to evaluate the capability gaps in the Missile defense review of C2BMC as well as the Nuclear Posture Review.
 In late December 2019, the Air Force, Army, and Navy ran a Joint all-domain command and control (JADC2) connection exercise of Advanced Battle Management System (ABMS) for the first time. This exercise is denoted ABMS Onramp, and will occur at four month intervals. JADC2 is a joint multi-domain operation (MDO); the exercise will involve the Army's Long range fires, ground-based troops, and Sentinel radar. The Air Force contributes F-22s and F-35s, while the Navy is bringing F-35Cs and a destroyer to ABMS Onramp. The December 2019 exercise used a NORTHCOM scenario.

The April 2020 test of ABMS was delayed by the COVID-19 pandemic. The test was to have spanned bases from Eglin AFB to Nellis AFB; from Yuma Proving Ground to White Sands Missile Range— in this test, a simulated attack was to take place on 3 geographic commands: on Space Command, on Northern Command, and on Strategic Command's nuclear command, control, and communications.

JADC2 is to ensure continuity of commander's intent— JADC2 was to be exercised in late August or early September 2020. Integrated Air and Missile Defense Battle Command System (IBCS) is undergoing a Limited user test in August–September 2020 in preparation for a Milestone C acquisition decision. IBCS is a critical building block for JADC2; the ABMS test is a separate project. Thirty-three different hardware platforms, some using 5G, 70 industry teams, and 65 government teams participated in this ABMS Onramp, the first week in September 2020. By 13 May 2021 the 28th Secretary of Defense had approved the JADC2 strategy. On 11 August 2021 JROC had identified a 5th functional capability (IAMD) in addition to the 4 functional battles, or competitive advantages already identified.

In August 2020 a Large force test event (LFTE) was completed at Nellis AFB; the test event demonstrated the ability of F-35s to orchestrate SEAD (Suppression of Enemy Air Defense) using F-22s, F-15Es, E/A-18Gs, B-2s, and RQ-170s. In addition the ability of F-35s to direct Multi-Domain Operations (MDO) was demonstrated during the 2020 Orange Flag event at Edwards AFB (Orange Flag showed the ability of an F-35A to collect targeting data, relay that data to an airborne communications node, as well as to a simulated IBCS station).
Project Convergence (PC20)
In Fall 2020, Futures Command is testing the data links between the Army's AI task force and its helicopters —Future Vertical Lift (FVL), its long-range missile launchers —Long range precision fires (LRPF), and its combat vehicles —(NGCV); in Fall 2021 and going forward, the links between ABMS and Multi-domain operations are invited when the Army's Air and Missile Defense capabilities (AMD's IBCS and MSHORAD —Maneuver short-range air defense) have undergone further testing.

In September 2020, an ABMS Demonstration at WSMR (White Sands Missile Range) shot down cruise missile surrogates with hypervelocity (speeds of Mach 5) projectiles jointly developed by the Army and Navy. The Army interceptor stems from an XM109 Paladin howitzer; the Navy interceptor stems from a deck gun. The data feeds used both 4G and 5G, as well as cloud-based AI feeds, to form the kill chains. The kill chains directing the intercepts were developed from 60 data feeds, and took seconds to develop, as opposed to the minutes which previous processes took. Other 'sensor-to-shooter' kill chains included AIM-9 missiles launched from F-16s and MQ-9s, as well as a ground-launched AIM-9 missile (which was designed to be an air-to-air munition). Four National Test Ranges were involved in the demonstration, as well as five combatant commands.
In October 2020 the DoD Acquisition chief completed an extensive redesign of the Adaptive acquisition framework (AAF) including software acquisition, middle-tier acquisition, defense business systems, acquisition of services, urgent capability acquisition and major capability acquisition. AAF now adheres to the updated DoD 5000.01 policy approved in September 2020 by her lead, the Deputy Defense Secretary.
PC21
See PC22
In March 2021, XVIII Airborne Corps hosts a Project Maven (DoD AI-based) live-fire experiment which shares targeting data among F-35s, A-10s, HIMARS, and satellites.

In June 2021 the 28th secretary of defense issued a classified memorandum directing the Services to engage in more joint experimentation and prototyping, in support of the All-domain operations (JADO) concept (the Joint warfighting concept).
In Fall 2021, a Joint Force (Army, Navy, Air Force, Marine Corps, and Special Operations) used Project Convergence 2021 (PC21) to simulate the distances in the First island chain of the Pacific Ocean, which Army Long-Range Precision Fires (LRPF) are to cover. A Multi-domain task force (MDTF), and Special Forces took the lead during the Competition phase of the exercise. In June 2021 the 35th Deputy secretary of defense announced
the RDER (Rapid defense experimentation reserve, "Raider") to fund those defense organizations which successfully institutionalize experiments to exercise joint warfighting capability.
One example might be, say an end-to-end flow of data, say in a kill chain from an intelligence, surveillance and reconnaissance detection of an enemy hypersonic weapons launch, to interdiction of the threat, to battle damage assessment.
Note that exercises to deepen a service silo have a disadvantage in a competition for RDER funding.
 an AI and data acceleration initiative to help the 11 combatant commands apply their new capabilities; teams of specialists are to assist the combatant commanders to automate the data flows of what are currently manual exercises in the respective command posts. The most effective processes are to be left in place after the exercises.

Integrated Air and Missile Defense Battle Command System (IBCS), an IAMD Battle Command System, is an Army project to unify its disparate anti-missile systems (such as the THAAD, and MIM-104 Patriot missiles) and their radars/sensors (such as THAAD's AN/TPY-2 radar, AN/MPQ-64 Sentinel, and Patriot AN/MPQ-65 radars). IBCS is being exercised in Fall 2021 (Project Convergence 2021) to experiment with its connection to JADC2 and ABMS. JROC is appending IAMD capability (IAMD interoperability) to the JWC (Joint warfighting concept) (Monte Carlo simulations of hundreds of thousands of IBCS missile data tracks were generated by an Army Air Defense Artillery battalion exercising IBCS in 2020; The test created terabytes of data to be queried. i.e., "connect any sensor to any shooter and any command and control node" —Eric Wesley)

In a review of Project Convergence 2021 (PC2021) the director of the Network Cross-functional team (CFT) was able to state 5 takeaways for the Integrated Tactical Network:
"the importance of a data fabric"— 
"a significant improvement in coverage from resilient wide-band satellite communications"— 
"the importance of an aerial tier to the network to improve the resiliency and range"
extending edge mesh networking
"the need for a joint operational common picture"–  ("provide commanders with a single pane of glass [on a computer screen]")

Crisis

By September 2020 the joint modernization efforts to retain overmatch in a crisis were visible in the press reports covering the joint level (DoD and the military departments).

In the view of John Hyten, 11th Vice Chairman of the Joint Chiefs, in a crisis, each force is to have both a self-defense capability, and a deep strike capability,
operating under a unified command and control structure, simultaneously across the domains, against the enemy. The potential capability exposed by the use of AI in September 2020 posed a choice for the combatant commanders, who needed to select their top priority, by answering "What do you want and how do we do it?" in November 2020. Hyten then had an opportunity to shape the operation of the Joint requirements oversight council, by providing a common operational picture to the combatant commanders and their forces in the respective domains, to get to a position of relative advantage very quickly (faster than the enemy's OODA loop).

In FY2021, TITAN (Tactical Intelligence Targeting Access Node) was to undergo an Analysis of Alternatives (AOA). TITAN is part of the network to integrate sensors and shooters in Multi-domain operations (MDO), in seconds. By FY2022 TITAN was meant to be a Program of Record, for CJADC2; additional  Soldier touchpoints will assess capabilities of two prototype satellite ground stations for downselect in 14 months by FY2023, and follow-on phases III and IV.

Return to competition
By 2020 the Joint all-domain concept was converging on the need for the allies and partners to convince the adversary that it is in everyone's interest to return to competition,
 well short of conflict between near-peer adversaries. In 2021 the 40th Chief of Staff of the Army described the Army's role in the Continuum of military competition, a Joint concept.

Alliances and partnerships

An ongoing series of programs to strengthen relationships between the Army and its allies and partners is being implemented. These programs include demonstrations of cooperation, interoperability, and preparedness of its partners. For example, in 2019 the Army uses DoD's State Partnership Program, to link 22 National Guard Bilateral Affairs Officers (BAOs) with 22 allies or partners in the 54 countries in European Command's area to facilitate common defense interests with the US. In all, 89 partnerships now exist. See: Foreign Area Officer (FAO) 

DoD's Joint AI Center (JAIC) has convened 100 online participants from 13 countries to discuss how to use AI in a way that is consonant with their national ethical principles, termed the 'AI Partnership for Defense' in 2020. For example, the US has a policy of human permission needed in order to trigger the automatic kill chains. In 2021 the 28th Secretary of defense committed to the department's ethical use of AI capabilities in a "responsible, equitable, traceable, reliable, and governable" way.

In 2019 the 27th Secretary of Defense Mark Esper identified the Indo-Pacific Theater as the priority theater for the United States. A multi-domain task force for the Indo-Pacific Theater is planned for a Defender exercise. However, in light of the DoD 60-day travel ban due to the COVID-19 pandemic, the number of CONUS-based troops participating in Defender Europe 2020 was reduced to those troops already in Europe.

In 2020 the Army lost 3 NTC training rotations to COVID-19.
JWA 20 was intended to exercise Multi-domain operations, and multinational forces, in EUCOM for 2020. See: Vostok 2018. EUCOM's Multi-domain task force is to be smaller than the Pacific's task force. It is expected that the task forces are to be employed in the Defender exercises in both EUCOM and the Pacific. Defender Europe 2020 was to test the ability to deploy 20,000 Soldiers across Europe, for a 37,000-member exercise. 
 Elements of the 1st Cavalry, 82nd Airborne, 1st Armored, 1st Infantry, and 3rd Infantry Divisions, 11 National Guard states and seven Army Reserve units were to rapidly deploy.
 Reception, staging, onward movement and integration (RSOI) of a division-sized formation in EUCOM. A National Guard Brigade was to draw from pre-positioned stocks in EUCOM.
 An immediate response force from 82nd Airborne Division was to conduct joint forcible entries.
 A division command post spread across Europe was to conduct JWA 20, to test multi-domain operations (MDO) and other Futures Command capabilities, such as an initial prototype of Tactical Intelligence Targeting Access Node (TITAN), a ground station for integrating the data feed between "sensors and shooters". 
While in Europe, the units were to spread out across the region for separate exercises with allies and partners to participate in their annual exercises.
 A river crossing (see M1074 Joint Assault Bridge), forward passages of lines (one unit passes through a position held by another unit), and a maritime off-load mission was to have been conducted.
 Army forces were to clear the training areas, return pre-positioned stocks, consolidate, and redeploy (in this case, to home station). Returning troops were ordered to quarantine for two weeks without experiencing any flu-like symptoms. Social distancing, masks, and other protective measures were employed, in response to the COVID-19 pandemic.
 Defender Europe 2021 ran from March til June 2021, involving dozens of operations, using 28,000 troops from 26 countries, from the Baltic nations to Morocco. Defender Europe 2021 integrated a V Corps command post exercise in preparation for operations with a multi-national division. Allies and partners were to participate in the chain of command, as well. See Defender Europe 2022
In April 2019 Germany's 1st Armored Division took the role of exercise High Command (HICON) at Hohenfels Training Area, primarily for German 21st Armored Brigade, the Lithuanian Iron Wolf Brigade, and their subordinate units; 5,630 participants from 15 nations took part in this Joint multinational exercise, which rotates the lead among the coalition partners. Germany's 1st Armored Division already had Dutch, British and Polish officers within its ranks. The Army's 2nd Battalion, 34th Armored Regiment, took part in the exercise. Six engineering advisor teams from 1st Security Force Assistance Brigade provided hands-on experience and testing of secure communications between NATO allies and partners.

A reciprocal exchange of general officers between France and the US is taking place in 2019, under the U.S. Army Military Personnel Exchange Program (MPEP). Such programs with the UK, Australia, and Canada have already existed with the US. A reciprocal pact for US and UK capabilities in Future Vertical Lift aircraft and Long Range Precision Fires artillery was signed in July 2020. The UK and Australia are planning to participate in the US Army's Project Convergence 2022.
Multi-domain task forces (MDTFs)

In April 2021, the Army announced that EUCOM's Multi-domain task force (MDTF), and a Theater Fires Command to control it, are to deploy to the European Theater, and are based in Wiesbaden, Germany. The Fires command is a headquarters to coordinate Long range fires (for ranges from 300 miles to thousands of miles) for the European theater.

 In April 2021, 3000 headquarters-level troops, including UK 3rd Division and French 3rd Division, came to Fort Hood to exercise Corps-level and Division-level staffs on Large-scale combat operations (LSCO). The Mission Command Center of Excellence (MCCoE) provided Opposing forces (OPFOR) and multiple dilemmas for the Warfighters to train on. III Armored Corps commander Pat White stated "the key goal of the exercise, to build international partnerships and increase interoperability, was realized". British and French commanders noted the need to further develop electronic warfare and signals intelligence capabilities.

In May 2021, 7th Army Training Command led Dynamic Front 21 (DF21), a USAEUR-AF exercise in integrating joint fires for artillery units from 15 nations. The exercise was meant to increase the readiness, lethality, and interoperability for nearly 1800 artillery troops from the 15 nations at Camp Aachen, Germany. Later locations for DF21 included Vilseck Army Air Field, Germany, Grafenwoehr Training Area, Germany, and Torun, Poland.

V Corps FOC

In October 2021 V Corps attained Full operational capability (FOC) by completing Warfighter exercise 22-1 (WFX 22-1), in a series of command post exercises in Large scale combat operations (LSCO). The operations involved a combatant command, Active Army, Reserve and National Guard components, a Theater training command, and a sustainment command, as well as multi-national partners. V Corps was slated to lead the Defender Europe 22, as of October 2021.

In 2020 the Secretary of the Army announced 5-month extended rotations to Indo-Pacific countries such as Thailand, the Philippines, and Papua New Guinea. Multi-Domain Operations (MDO) task forces in the region have already been engaging in MDO-like exercises in concert with the armed forces of Japan, Thailand, and Singapore.

Two Multi-domain task forces are being requested for Indo-Pacom for 2021. 5th Security Force Assistance Brigade is regionally aligned with USINDOPACOM, and plans to keep one-third of the brigade's advisor teams there at all times, while the other teams train at home station (JBLM), for their assignments in the region. The third and fourth ABMS Onramp exercises of Joint all-domain command and control (JADC2) are being planned in 2020, and 2021 for INDOPACOM, and EUCOM respectively. This is meant to bring key US allies into the planning for the Joint All-Domain Operations Concept, thereby enabling their "participation in planning, execution and then debrief" after a coalition exercise in overmatching the adversary, and maintaining a Common operational picture (COP), to review measured responses, both kinetic and nonkinetic. The COVID-19 pandemic actually provided the impetus for rapid fielding of a DoD technology for separating Top secret, Secret, and Unclassified messaging, a necessary function for the Intelligence community. The JSIL connection of experimental networks with Army battle labs is a way to determine the bandwidth needed for these vignettes, to prepare Project Convergence 2021 for Joint All-Domain Command and Control (JADC2).

Defender Pacific 2021 focuses on the southwest Pacific region. The Army was to draw from a pre-positioned stock for its units, exercise its watercraft and an MDTF's long range precision fires. In 2021 the 28th Secretary of Defense, Lloyd Austin, stated he expected to "review our posture in the Pacific from all aspects including presence, capabilities, logistics, exercises, infrastructure, and capacity building and cooperation with allies and partners" during his questioning by the Senate Armed Services Committee. Integrated deterrence is the objective of the 28th Secretary of defense, in joint exercises in Australian waters, with HMS Queen Elizabeth (R08)
in the South China Sea, and by US Special Forces soldiers (Green Berets) with Japan's Self-defense force (JGSDF) parachuting onto Guam.
On 15 September 2021 the ministers of defense, and foreign affairs, and the secretaries of defense, and state for Australia, and the US, respectively, namely Peter Dutton, Marise Payne, Lloyd Austin, and Antony Blinken signed statements of intent to jointly build nuclear submarines, and share National Reconnaissance Office (NRO) data, as well as a space framework. See AUKUS. On 24 September 2021 the heads of state of Australia, India, Japan, and the US (the Quadrilateral Security Dialog) met face-to-face to discuss cybersecurity, and fix supply chain vulnerabilities, such as electronic chip, and 5G technology. FY2021 marks the end of the Army's manpower expansion, in its effort to modernize.
Arctic strategy
In January 2021 the Army announced its arctic strategy, for arctic, extreme cold, and mountainous environments, which affect the NORTHCOM, EUCOM, and INDOPACOM combatant commands. A two-star multi-domain-enabled operational headquarters will be established for the Arctic. Soldiers will be receiving extra support for adapting to the Alaskan Arctic, beginning in 2022 and going forward. The BCTs of US Army Alaska are reflagging as of 6 June 2022 from 1st SBCT/25th ID, and 4th IBCT/25th ID, to 1st IBCT/11th ID (Airborne), and 2nd IBCT/11th ID (Airborne) respectively; US Army Alaska is now 11th Infantry Division (Airborne) as of 6 June 2022. The Bundeswehr is thinking of training in Alaska.
An Arctic Multi-domain task force (MDTF) was planned, to balance the interests of the 8 partners of the Arctic Council, which include Russia, and China as an observer nation. See Cold Response
Defender Europe 2022
Defender Europe 2022 started 3 May 2022, under the command and control of V Corps, which has had a forward-deployed Headquarters in Europe since 2021. The exercises will involve 11 allied and partner nations, including Denmark, Estonia, Germany, France, Latvia, Lithuania, Netherlands, Poland, Slovakia, Sweden, and Great Britain. Defender Europe 2022 had been previously planned, on a longer timescale than the wartime events of 2022, such as the 2022 Russian invasion of Ukraine. For example, a float ribbon bridge was erected by troops from Fort Hood, Texas who are deploying to Europe. The bridge came from pre-positioned stocks drawn from APS-2, located in Europe. 
PC22
 Australia, New Zealand, the UK, Canada, and other allies and partners (such as universities) expect they will bring experiments or prototype capabilities to Project Convergence 2022. PC22 will require connection of the allies and partners; the connections were exercised during COMMEX 1B in June. Global defender 2022 (GD22) will culminate with Project Convergence 2022 (PC22).   In the week of 6 Jun 2022 planning for PC22 at Fort Bliss was finalized. The UK and Australian planners were added to the PC22 experiment; their concepts join the 100 techologies incorporated by USAF, Navy, Marines, and Space Force planners. The commander of AFC's Futures and Concepts Lieutenant Gen. Scott McKean, and peers for the services and allies took this opportunity to mutually review their plans for the FY2022 event.

The Synthetic Training Environment's One World Terrain (OWT) data sets are beginning to be used as operational planning tools, for example by V corps, and at PC20, and at PC21. As virtual maps, rather than paper maps, they can project scenarios which will also be used at PC22 in October and November 2022.

In October 2022, the experiments from the previous Project Convergence were scaled up, from just Army in PC21 to joint and international exercises in PC22. AI was utilized not just for autonomous flight, but also for predicting where logistics would be needed in contested environments. PC22 experimented with some 300 technologies.  Scenarios during PC22 included Tomahawk, SM-6, and LRHW missiles. 82nd Airborne participated in the PC22 experiments, using newly developed equipment.          

In November 2022, a contested logistics exercise, using an uninhabited Black Hawk helicopter under autonomous control was demonstrated at PC22.
PC24

 Project Convergence co-locates from WSMR and YPG (the hub), to allies and partners. PC24 could occur by spring 2024.

Training and readiness
Under Schoomaker, combat training centers (CTCs) emphasized the contemporary operating environment (such as an urban, ethnically-sensitive city in Iraq) and stress units according to the unit mission and the commanders' assessments, collaborating often to support holistic collective training programs, rather than by exception as was formerly the case.

Schoomaker's plan was to resource units based on the mission they are expected to accomplish (major combat versus SASO, or stability and support operations), regardless of component (active or reserve). Instead of using snapshot readiness reports, the Army now rates units based on the mission they are expected to perform given their position across the three force pools ('reset', 'train/ready', and 'available'). The Army now deploys units upon each commanders' signature on the certificate of their unit's assessment (viz., Ready). As of June 2016, only one-third of the Army's brigades were ready to deploy. By 2019, two-thirds of the Active Army's brigades and half of the BCTs of the Total Army (both Active and Reserve components) are now at the highest level of readiness. The FY2021 budget request allows two-thirds of the Total Army (1,012,200 Soldiers by 2022) to reach the highest level of readiness by FY2022 —Maj. Gen. Paul Chamberlain.

"Soldiers need to be ready 100 percent of the time."—Robert B. Abrams, FORSCOM commander, June 2, 2016

39th Chief of Staff Mark Milley's readiness objective is that all operational units be at 90 percent of the authorized strength in 2018, at 100 percent by 2021, and at 105 percent by 2023.
The observer coach/trainers at the combat training centers, recruiters, and drill sergeants are to be filled to 100 percent strength by the end of 2018. In November 2018, written deployability standards (Army Directive 2018–22) were set by the Secretary and the Chief of Staff of the Army; failure to meet the standard means a soldier has six months to remedy this, or face separation from the Army. The directive does not apply to about 60,000 of the 1,016,000 Soldiers of the Army; 70–80 percent of the 60,000 are non-deployable for medical reasons. Non-deployables have declined from 121,000 in 2017. The Army combat fitness test (ACFT) will test all soldiers; at the minimum, the 3-Repetition Maximum Deadlift, the Sprint-Drag-Carry and an aerobic event will be required of all soldiers, including those with profiles (meaning there is an annotation in their record See: PULHES Factor); the assessment of the alternative aerobic test will be completed by 19 October 2019.

Soldier and Family Readiness Groups
By 2022 surveys of military servicemen, veterans, and spouses and family  were indicating that financial and other difficulties were raising questions about the viability of an all-volunteer force.

Soldiers and Army spouses belong to Soldier and Family Readiness Groups (SFRGs), renamed from (FRGs) which mirror the command structure of an Army unit—the spouse of the 40th Chief of Staff of the United States Army has served on the FRG at every echelon of the Army. The name change to SFRG is to be more inclusive of single soldiers, single parents, and also those with nontraditional families. An S/FRG seeks to meet the needs of soldiers and their families, for example during a deployment, or to address privatized housing deficiencies, or to aid spouses find jobs. As a soldier transfers in and out of an installation, the soldier's entire family will typically undergo a permanent change of station (PCS) to the next post. PCS to Europe and Japan is now uniformly for 36 months, regardless of family status (formerly 36 months for families). Transfers typically follow the cycle of the school year to minimize disruption in an Army family. By policy, DoD families stationed in Europe and Japan who have school-aged children are served by American school systems— the Department of Defense Dependents Schools. Noncombatant evacuation operations are a contingency which an FRG could publicize and plan for, should the need arise. In 2021, a new Exceptional Family Member Program (EFMP) is being tested by 300 families who are undergoing a permanent change of station (PCS).

When a family emergency occurs, the informal support of that unit's S/FRG is available to the soldier. (But the Army Emergency Relief fund is available to any soldier with a phone call to their local garrison. Seventy-five Fisher Houses maintain home-away-from-home suites for families undergoing medical treatment of a loved one. The Army, Navy, and Air Force Medical Treatment Facilities (MTFs) are scheduled to complete their transfer to the Defense Health Agency (DHA) no later than 21 October 2021. This has been a ten-year process. The directors of each home installation's Medical treatment facility (MTF) continue to report to the commanders of their respective installations. This change transfers all civilian employees of each Medical treatment facility (MTF) to the Defense Health Agency (DHA).) The name change links Soldier Readiness with Family Readiness. Commanders will retain full responsibility for Soldier sponsorship after a move, especially for first term Soldiers in that move.

In response to Army tenant problems with privatized base housing, IMCOM was subordinated to Army Materiel Command (AMC) on 8 March 2019. By 2020, AMC's commander and the Residential community initiative (RCI) groups had formulated a 50-year plan. The Army's RCI groups, "seven private housing companies, which have 50-year lease agreements" on 98% of Army housing at 44 installations, will work with the Army for long-term housing improvements, and remediation.

In 2020 Secretary McCarthy determined that the Sexual Harassment/Assault Response & Prevention (SHARP) program has failed to meet its mandate, particularly for young unmarried Soldiers at Fort Hood and Camp Casey, South Korea. Missing soldiers were previously classified as Absent without leave until enough time has elapsed to be denoted deserters, rather than victims of a crime; the Army has established a new classification for missing Soldiers, to merit police investigation.

In response to the report of the Fort Hood Independent Review Committee, the Army has established the People first task force (PFTF), an Army-wide task force that is headed by 3 chairs: 1) Lt. Gen. Gary M. Brito, 2) Diane M. Randon, and 3) Sgt. Maj. Julie A.M. Guerra, who are: 1) the deputy chief of staff G-1, 2) the assistant deputy chief of staff G-2, and 3) the assistant deputy chief of staff G-2 Sgt. Maj. respectively. Cohesion assessment teams (CATs), part of the People first task force, work with brigade commanders on their brigade's command climate. The Cohesion assessment team interviews members of that brigade or battalion, to identify any problems. The CAT then works with the unit commanders to address the root causes of those problems. On 13 May 2022 Fort Hood's People First Center opened its doors; the center is to offer immersive experiences for participants over several days, centered on "family advocacy, sexual harassment and assault prevention, equal opportunity, resiliency, substance abuse, suicide [prevention] (The Senate Armed Services Committee is requesting that the military track suicides by MOS.), and spiritual readiness ... all housed at the center with training focused on immersion", collocated with subject matter experts.

USAR mobilization
See: Soldier Readiness Processing
Plans are being formulated for mobilization of the Army Reserve (42,000 to 45,000 soldiers) very quickly.
For example, 'Ready Force X' (RFX) teams have fielded Deployment Assistance Team Command and Control Cells to expedite the associated equipment to the various ports and vessels which is required for the specific Reserve personnel who have been notified that they are deploying. FORSCOM's mobilization and force generation installations (MFGIs) have fluctuated from two primary installations (2018) to an envisioned eleven primary and fourteen contingency MFGIs, in preparation for future actions against near-peers.

National Guard training
The 29th chief of the National Guard Bureau, as director of the Army National Guard, plans to align existing ARNG divisions with subordinate training formations. This plan increases the number of divisions in the Total Army from 10 to 18, and increases the readiness of the National Guard divisions, by aligning their training plans with large-scale combat operations. Additional advantages of the August 2020 plan are increased opportunity for talent management, from the Company to the Division level, and opportunity for leader development unfettered by geographical restriction.

"Associated units" training program
The Army announced a pilot program, 'associated units', in which a National Guard or Reserve unit would now train with a specific active Army formation. These units would wear the patch of the specific Army division before their deployment to a theater; 36th Infantry Division (United States) headquarters deployed to Afghanistan in May 2016 for a train, advise, assist mission.

The Army Reserve, whose headquarters are colocated with FORSCOM, and the National Guard, are testing the associated units program in a three-year pilot program with the active Army. The program will use the First Army training roles at the Army Combat Training Centers at Fort Irwin, Fort Polk, and regional and overseas training facilities.

The pilot program complements FORSCOM's total force partnerships with the National Guard, begun in 2014.
Summer 2016 will see the first of these units.

Associated units 
 3rd Infantry BCT, 10th Mountain Division, stationed at Fort Polk, Louisiana, associated with the 36th Infantry Division, Texas Army National Guard
 48th Infantry BCT, Georgia ARNG, associated with the 3rd Infantry Division, Stationed at Fort Stewart, Georgia
 86th Infantry BCT, Vermont ARNG, associated with the 10th Mountain Division, stationed at Fort Drum, New York
 81st Armored BCT, Washington ARNG, associated with the 7th Infantry Division, stationed at Joint Base Lewis-McChord, Washington
 Task Force 1-28th Infantry Battalion., 3rd Infantry Division, stationed at Fort Benning, Georgia, associated with the 48th Infantry BCT, Georgia Army National Guard
 100th Battalion, 442nd Infantry Regiment, USAR, associated with the 3rd Infantry BCT, 25th Infantry Division, stationed at Schofield Barracks, Hawaii
 1st Battalion (Airborne), 143rd Infantry Regiment Texas ARNG, associated with the 173rd Airborne BCT, stationed in Vicenza, Italy
 1st Battalion, 151st Infantry Regiment, Indiana ARNG, associated with the 2nd Infantry BCT, 25th Infantry Division, stationed at Schofield Barracks
 5th Engineer Battalion, stationed at Fort Leonard Wood, Missouri, associated with the 35th Engineer Brigade, Missouri ARNG
 840th Engineer Company, Texas ARNG, associated with the 36th Engineer Brigade, stationed at Fort Hood, Texas
 824th Quartermaster Company, USAR, associated with the 82nd Airborne Division's Sustainment Brigade, stationed at Fort Bragg, North Carolina
 249th Transportation Company, Texas ARNG, associated with the 1st Cavalry Division's Sustainment Brigade., stationed in Fort Hood
 1245th Transportation Company, Oklahoma ARNG, associated with the 1st Cavalry Division's Sustainment Brigade., stationed in Fort Hood
 1176th Transportation Company, Tennessee ARNG, associated with the 101st Airborne Division's Sustainment Brigade, stationed at Fort Campbell, Kentucky
 2123rd Transportation Company, Kentucky ARNG, associated with the 101st Airborne Division's Sustainment Brigade, stationed at Fort Campbell

Rifleman training
Soldiers train for weapons handling, and marksmanship first individually, on static firing ranges, and then on simulators such as an Engagement Skills Trainer (EST). More advanced training on squad level simulators (Squad Advanced Marksmanship-Trainer (SAMT)) place a squad in virtual engagements against avatars of various types, using M4 carbine, M249 light machine gun and M9 Beretta pistol simulated weapon systems. Home stations are to receive Synthetic training environments (STEs) for mission training, as an alternative to rotations to the National Combat Training Centers, which operate Brigade-level training against an Opposing force (OPFOR) with near-peer equipment.

Some installations have urban training facilities for infantrymen, in preparation for Brigade-level training.

A 2019 marksmanship manual "TC 3-20.40, Training and Qualification-Individual Weapons" (the Dot-40) now mandates the use of the simulators, as if the Soldier were in combat. The Dot-40 is to be used by the entire Army, from the Cadets at West Point, to the Active Army, the Army Reserve, and Army National Guard; the Dot-40 tests how rapidly Soldiers can load and reload while standing, kneeling, lying prone, and firing from behind a barrier. The marksmanship tests of a Soldier's critical thinking, selecting targets to shoot at, in which order, and the accuracy of each shot are recorded by the simulators.

Stryker training
Up to a platoon-sized unit of a Stryker brigade combat team, and dismounted infantry, can train on Stryker simulators (Stryker Virtual Collective Trainer – SVCT), which are in the process of being installed at 8 home stations. The 4th is being completed. Forty-five infantrymen (4 Stryker shells) or thirty-six scouts (6 Stryker shells) can rehearse their battle rhythm on a virtual battlefield, record their lessons learned, give their after-action reports, and repeat, as a team. The Stryker gunner's seat comes directly from a Stryker vehicle and has a Common Remotely Operated Weapon Station (CROWS) and joystick to control a virtual .50 caliber machine gun or a virtual 30 mm autocannon.

Other CROWS configurations are possible.

Digital air ground integration ranges (DAGIRs)
Live-fire digital air ground integration ranges (DAGIRs) were first conceptualized in the 1990s, and established in 2012, with follow-on in 2019. The ranges initially included 23 miles of tank trails, targets, battlefield effects simulators, and digital wiring for aerial scorekeeping. These ranges are designed for coordinating air and ground exercises before full-on sessions at the National Training Centers.

Training against OPFORs

To serve a role as an Opposing force (OPFOR) could be a mission for an Army unit, as temporary duty (TDY), during which they might wear old battle dress uniforms, perhaps inside-out. TRADOC's Mission Command Training Program, as well as Cyber Command designs tactics for these OPFORs. When a brigade trains at Fort Irwin, Fort Polk, Joint Pacific Multinational Readiness Center, or Joint Multinational Training Center (in Hohenfels, Germany) the Army tasks 11th Armored Cavalry Regiment, 1st Battalion, 509th Infantry Regiment (Abn), 196th Infantry Brigade, and 1st Battalion, 4th Infantry Regiment, respectively, with the OPFOR role, and provides the OPFOR with modern equipment (such as the FGM-148 Javelin) to test that brigade's readiness for deployment. Multiple integrated laser engagement systems serve as proxies for actual fired weapons, and Soldiers are lost to the commander from "kills" by laser hits.

Training against cyber
Deceptive data intended to divide deployed forces are making their way into the news feeds, and are falsely implicating actual soldiers who are deployed at the time of the false social media reports, which are mixing fact and fiction.

The Army now has its 10th direct-commissioned cyber officer: a Sergeant First Class with a computer engineering degree, and a masters in system engineering was commissioned a Major in the National Guard, 91st Cyber Brigade, on 30 July 2020.

Soldier integration facility
PEO Soldier has established a Soldier integration facility (SIF) at Fort Belvoir which allows prototyping and evaluation of combat capabilities for the Army Soldier. CCDC Soldier center in Natick Massachusetts, Night Vision Lab at Fort Belvoir Virginia, and Maneuver Battle Lab at Fort Benning Georgia have prototyped ideas at the SIF.

Applications for Synthetic Training Environment (STE)
The Squad Advanced Marksmanship Training (SAMT) system, developed by the STE Cross-functional team from Futures Command, has an application for 1st SFAB. Bluetooth enabled replicas of M4 rifles and M9 and Glock 19 pistols, with compressed air recoil approximate the form, fit and function of the weapons that the Soldiers are using in close combat. For 1st SFAB, scenarios included virtual reality attacks which felt like engagements in a room. The scenarios can involve the entire SFAB Advisor team, and engagements can be repeated over and over again. Advanced marksmanship skills such as firing with the non-dominant hand, and firing on the move can be practiced.

Nine Army sites are now equipped with the SAMT. Over twenty systems are planned for locations in the United States. The Close combat tactical trainers are in use, for example, to train 3rd Infantry Division headquarters for a gunnery training event (convoy protection role), and 2nd BCT/ 82nd Airborne close combat training.

The concept has been extended to the Live, Virtual, Constructive Integrating Architecture (LVC-IA), to integrate the National Guard, and the Reserves, with Active Army.
"A simulation places leadership teams in a situation akin to a Combat Training Center rotation, an intellectually and emotionally challenging environment that forgives the mistakes of the participants "—Dr. Charles K. Pickar
"It is important for Soldiers to have an open and clear mind during the simulation so that they learn something from the experience." —Tim Glaspie
"Repetition increases a team's situational understanding of the tactics they'll use" —Maj. Anthony Clas

Other training environments include MANPADS for SHORAD in the 14P MOS at Fort Sill.

Deployment scheme

The force generation system, posited in 2006 by General Schoomaker, projected that the U.S. Army would be deployed continuously. The Army would serve as an expeditionary force to fight a protracted campaign against terrorism and stand ready for other potential contingencies across the full-spectrum of operations (from humanitarian and stability operations to major combat operations against a conventional foe).

Under ideal circumstances, Army units would have a minimum "dwell time," a minimum duration of which it would remain at home station before deployment. Active-duty units would be prepared to deploy once every three years. Army Reserve units would be prepared to deploy once every five years. National Guard units would be prepared to deploy once every six years. A total of 71 combat brigades would form the Army's rotation basis, 42 from the active component with the balance from the reserves.

Thus, around 15 active-duty combat brigades would be available for deployment each year under the 2006 force-generation plan. An additional 4 or 5 brigades would be available for deployment from the reserve component. The plan was designed to provide more stability to soldiers and their families. Within the system, a surge capability would exist so that about an additional 18 brigades could be deployed in addition to the 19 or 20 scheduled brigades.

From General Dan McNeil, former Army Forces Command (FORSCOM) Commander: Within the Army Forces Generation (ARFORGEN) model, brigade combat teams (BCTs) would move through a series of three force pools; they would enter the model at its inception, the "reset force pool", upon completion of a deployment cycle. There they would re-equip and reman while executing all individual predeployment training requirements, attaining readiness as quickly as possible. Reset or "R" day, recommended by FORSCOM and approved by Headquarters, Department of the Army, would be marked by BCT changes of command, preceded or followed closely by other key leadership transitions. While in the reset pool, formations would be remanned, reaching 100% of mission required strength by the end of the phase, while also reorganizing and fielding new equipment, if appropriate. In addition, it is there that units would be confirmed against future missions, either as deployment expeditionary forces (DEFs-BCTs trained for known operational requirements), ready expeditionary forces (REFs-BCTs that form the pool of available forces for short-notice missions) or contingency expeditionary forces (CEFs-BCTs earmarked for contingency operations).

Based on their commanders' assessments, units would move to the ready force pool, from which they could deploy should they be needed, and in which the unit training focus would be at the higher collective levels. Units would enter the available force pool when there is approximately one year left in the cycle, after validating their collective mission-essential task list proficiency (either core or theater-specific tasks) via battle-staff and dirt-mission rehearsal exercises. The available phase would be the only phase with a specified time limit: one year. Not unlike the division-ready brigades of past decades, these formations would deploy to fulfill specific requirements or stand ready to fulfill short-notice deployments within 30 days.

The goal was to generate forces 12–18 months in advance of combatant commanders' requirements and to begin preparing every unit for its future mission as early as possible in order to increase its overall proficiency.

Personnel management would also be reorganized as part of the Army transformation. Previously, personnel was managed on an individual basis in which soldiers were rotated without regard for the effect on unit cohesion. This system required unpopular measures such as "stop loss" and "stop move" in order to maintain force levels. In contrast, the new personnel system would operate on a unit basis to the maximum extent possible, with the goal of allowing teams to remain together longer and enabling families to establish ties within their communities.

Abrams 2016 noted that mid-level Army soldiers found they faced an unexpected uptempo in their requirements, while entry-level soldiers in fact welcomed the increased challenge.

Readiness model
ARFORGEN, "a structured progression of increased unit readiness over time, resulting in recurring periods of availability of trained, ready, and cohesive units prepared for operational deployment in support of geographic Combatant Commander requirements" was utilized in the 2010s. ARFORGEN was replaced by the Sustainable Readiness Model (SRM) in 2017. In 2016 the 39th Chief of Staff of the Army identified the objective of a sustainable readiness process as over 66 percent of the Active Army in combat ready state at any time; in 2019 the readiness objective of the National Guard and Army Reserve units was set to be 33 percent; Total Army readiness for deployment was 40 percent in 2019.

ReARMM (Regionally Aligned Readiness and Modernization Model) is a unit lifecycle model which goes into effect in October 2021. ReARMM was introduced in October 2020. It is a force generation model which uses the total Army, the Reserve components as well as Active component when planning. Dynamic force employment (DFE) will be used more often. The Operational tempo will decrease, which gives Commanders will more times, 'training windows' during which their units can train, first at the small-unit level, and then at larger-step modernization of their formations. The units can then train at echelon for Large scale combat operations (LSCO) at a more measured pace.

In 2018 39th Chief of Staff Mark Milley's readiness objective is that all operational units be at 90 percent of the authorized strength in 2018, at 100 percent by 2021, and at 105 percent by 2023. The observer coach/trainers at the combat training centers, recruiters, and drill sergeants are to be filled to 100 percent strength by the end of 2018.

The requested strength of the Active Army in FY2020 is increasing by 4,000 additional troops from the current 476,000 soldiers; this request covers the near-term needs for cyber, air & missile defense, and fires (Army modernization).
Organic industrial base (OIB)
The Army’s Organic industrial base (OIB) Modernization Implementation Plan got a refresh in 2022, with a review of the "23 depots, arsenals and ammunition plants that manufacture, reset and maintain Army equipment", in light of the 2022 Russian invasion of Ukraine.

The Acting CG of FORSCOM, Lt. Gen. Laura Richardson, has noted that the Sustainable Readiness Model uses the Army standard for maintenance readiness, denoted TM 10/20, which makes commanders responsible for maintaining their equipment to the TM 10/20 standard, meaning that "all routine maintenance is executed and all deficiencies are repaired". But Richardson has also spoken out about aviation-related supplier deficiencies hurting readiness both at the combatant commands and at the home stations.

Prepositioned stocks

Army Materiel Command (AMC), which uses Army Field Support Brigades (AFSBs) to provision the Combatant Commands, has established Army prepositioned stocks (APS) for supplying entire Brigade Combat Teams (BCTs), at several areas of responsibility (AORs):
APS-1 is Continental US (CONUS)
APS-2 in EUCOM, using several sites, will accelerate the flow of up-to-date materiel there, to forward-operating sites.
APS-3 in Pacific Ocean, uses ocean-going vessels.
 The materiel positioning is allocated under the Calibrated force posture:
 Some materiel will be drawn by units under the Dynamic force employment (DFE) initiative
 Some troop units will be forward deployed
 Some troop units will rotate in
 Some prepositioned stock is under discussion with specific nations with agreements to be announced (currently classified as of October 2020)
 An SFAB is allocated to the Pacific AoR
APS-4 in NE Asia
APS-5 in CENTCOM's Camp Arifjan, Kuwait, and SW Asia
By 2020 AMC had seven Army prepositioned stocks.

Medical readiness is being tested by the U.S. Army Medical Materiel Agency, an LCMC. The LCMCs are stocking three additional locations in the US (APS-1), as well as APS-2 (EUCOM), and Korea, as of 12 February 2019. For example, during Operation Spartan Shield, the LCMC's relevant AFSB effected the hand-off of prepositioned stocks to 155th Armored Brigade Combat Team (ABCT) within 96 hours. In the same Operation, 155th ABCT was issued an entire equipment set for an ABCT, drawn from APS-5 stocks, over 13,000 pieces.

Air Defense Artillery deployments
On 27 March 2018 the 678th Air Defense Artillery Brigade (South Carolina National Guard) deployed to EUCOM, Ansbach Germany for a nine-month rotation, for the first time since the Cold War. 10th AAMDC is the executive agent for EUCOM.

In September 2018, the Wall Street Journal reported that four Patriot systems— Two from Kuwait, and one apiece from Jordan and Bahrain are redeploying back to the U.S. for refurbishment and upgrades, and will not be replaced. In June 2021, 8 Patriot batteries and a THAAD battery are being withdrawn from the CENTCOM area to focus on Russia and China. By March 2022 NATO Patriot batteries had begun repositioning to Slovakia, and Poland from the Netherlands, and Germany respectively.

Forward-deployed materiel
As the U.S. Army's only forward-deployed Airborne brigade, 173rd Airborne Brigade Combat Team, stationed in EUCOM, was supplied with new communications materiel — Integrated Tactical Networks (ITN) in 2018. New ground combat vehicles, the Infantry Carrier Vehicle – Dragoon (ICVD) are being supplied to 2nd Cavalry Regiment. ICVDs are Strykers with an unmanned turret and 30 mm autocannon (CROWS), and an integrated commander's station, upgraded suspension and larger tires. The Army brigades of EUCOM have been in position for testing materiel, as its elements engaged in a 2018 road march through Europe, training with 19 ally and partner nations in Poland in 2018.

Dynamic force employment

This initiative, designed by then-DoD-Secretary James Mattis, exercises the ability of selected BCTs to rapidly surge combat-ready forces into a theater, such as EUCOM, on short notice. In several such cases, at the direction of the Secretary of Defense in March 2019, troops were rapidly alerted, recalled and deployed to a forward position, under (simulated) emergency conditions, to prove a capability (such as an ABCT, and a THAAD battery) against near-peers. 
The ABCT element next participated in a joint live-fire exercise with Polish troops of the 12th Mechanized Brigade, 12th Mechanised Division (Poland) in Drawsko Pomorskie Training Area, Poland. (A Mission Command element of TRADOC served in the role of echelon-above-brigade for the maneuver and interoperability of the joint multi-national armored brigades.) In September 2018, the 278th Armored Cavalry Regiment had already assumed a forward deployment in Poland. Poland and the US are planning for regular rotations going forward. 

Similar initiatives are planned for other alliances.

In August 2020 Poland agreed to pay almost all costs associated with US presence in the country;
 a forward command post for V Corps in Poland has been codified in an Enhanced Defense Cooperation Agreement between the US and Poland.
 Poland is buying 250 M1A2 Abrams tanks as of 14 July 2021. Poland ordered an additional 116 used M1A1 Abrams tanks, with faster delivery dates on 15 July 2022. Poland is buying 96 AH-64E Apaches (6 squadrons). A Combat Aviation Brigade element, an Armored Combat Brigade element, and a Division Headquarters element will rotate in. 

FORSCOM exercised its Emergency deployment readiness exercises (EDREs) in 2019 by sending 2nd Brigade Combat Team, 10th Mountain Division to the Joint Readiness Training Center in Fort Polk, Louisiana, by sealift, simultaneously exercising the logistics planners at Fort Drum, the seaports in Philadelphia, Pennsylvania, and Port Arthur, Texas, as well as 2nd BCT. Through the EDRE program, 20 of the ports have been exercised to ready them for sealift deployments. A division-sized move of 20,000 pieces of equipment from the US to Europe began a month-long process in January 2020. In 2020 the pre-COVID-19 plan was "wide-spanning maneuvers will focus on the Baltic States, Poland, and Georgia" (at the time) which would have involved 36,000 troops from 11 countries ranging from the Baltic to the Black Seas, a number still in flux. A number of the Defender-2020 objectives were met in 2020, despite a 60-day travel ban by DoD.

By 2020 the 27th Secretary of Defense signaled that ABMS, its Internet of Military Things, and JADC2 were important parts for Dynamic force employment (DFE) in the Joint All-domain Operations Concept. The Combatant commanders at Eucom, and at IndoPacom seek the AGM-183A (ARRW) hypersonic weapon on the bomber fleet for Dynamic force employment.

In light of the 2022 Russian invasion of Ukraine, thousands more troops have posted or rotated to Europe. As of February 2023 the US is planning a HIMARS training center in Poland. In order to get 31 Abrams tanks to Ukraine, the Army is weighing options with the fastest delivery times, none of which are sooner than year-end 2023.

Force size and unit organization
Overall, the Army would end up with 71 brigade combat teams and 212 support brigades, in the pre-2013 design. The Regular Army would move from 33 brigade combat teams in 2003 to 43 brigade combat teams together with 75 modular support brigades, for a total of 118 Regular Army modular brigades. In addition the previously un-designated training brigades such as the Infantry Training Brigade at Fort Benning assumed the lineage & honors of formerly active Regular Army combat brigades. In 2017 there were 31 brigade combat teams in the Active Army. Within the Army National Guard, there were to be 28 brigade combat teams and 78 support brigades. Within the Army Reserve, the objective was 59 support brigades. (39th Chief of Staff Mark Milley credits the 27th Chief, Creighton Abrams, for placing most of the support brigades in the Reserve and National Guard, in order to ensure that the nation would use the total army, rather than only the active army alone, in an extended war involving the entire nation.)

The Reserve component will be playing an increased role.
In the Total Army, 8 ARNG divisions are to be trained to increase their readiness for large-scale combat operations, making 58 BCTs in the Total Army in 2018, and 6 SFABs in 2020.

Army commands
United States Army Forces Command headquartered at Fort Bragg, North Carolina
United States Army Futures Command headquarters in Austin, Texas
United States Army Materiel Command headquartered at Redstone Arsenal, Alabama
United States Army Training and Doctrine Command headquartered at Joint Base Langley-Eustis, Virginia

Army service component commands
Geographic commands
United States Army Central / Third Army headquartered at Shaw Air Force Base, South Carolina
United States Army North / Fifth Army headquartered at Joint Base San Antonio, Texas
United States Army South / Sixth Army headquartered at Joint Base San Antonio, Texas
United States Army Europe-Africa / Seventh Army headquartered at Wiesbaden, Germany
United States Army Pacific headquartered at Fort Shafter, Hawaii
Functional commands
United States Army Space and Missile Defense Command headquartered at Redstone Arsenal, Alabama
United States Army Special Operations Command headquartered at Fort Bragg, North Carolina
Military Surface Deployment and Distribution Command headquartered at Scott Air Force Base, Illinois
United States Army Cyber Command headquartered at Fort Gordon, Georgia

Army direct reporting units
United States Army Medical Command (MEDCOM)
United States Army Intelligence and Security Command (INSCOM) headquartered at Fort Belvoir, Virginia
United States Army Corps of Engineers
United States Military Academy
United States Army Military District of Washington (MDW) headquartered at Fort McNair, District of Columbia
United States Army Criminal Investigation Division (USACID) headquartered at Marine Corps Base Quantico, Virginia
United States Army Test and Evaluation Command (ATEC)

Field armies
First US Army, headquartered at Rock Island Arsenal, Illinois (A component of FORSCOM; responsible for training the reserve components when mobilized for overseas deployment)
Eighth US Army, headquartered at Camp Humphreys, South Korea (component of United States Forces Korea)

Army corps
I Corps headquartered at Joint Base Lewis-McChord, Washington
III Armored Corps headquartered at Fort Hood, Texas
V Corps headquartered at Fort Knox, Kentucky
XVIII Airborne Corps headquartered at Fort Bragg, North Carolina

Divisions and brigades
Note: these formations were subject to change, announced in 2013 reform
In the post-2013 design, the Regular Army was planned to reduce to 32 BCTs after all the BCTs had been announced for inactivation.
The 2018 budget was to further reduce 40,000 active-duty soldiers from 490,000 in 2015 to 450,000 by 2018 fiscal year-end. Thirty installations would have been affected; six of these installations would have accounted for over 12,000 of those to be let go. In early 2015, the plan was to cut entire BCTs; by July 2015, a new plan, to downsize a BCT (4,500 soldiers) to a maneuver battalion task force (1,032 soldiers, with the possibility of upsizing if need be) was formulated. In 2015, a plan was instituted to allow further shrinking of the Army, by converting selected brigades to maneuver battalion task forces. A maneuver battalion task force includes about 1,050 Soldiers rather than the 4,000 in a full BCT. This 9 July 2015 plan, however, would preclude rapid deployment of such a unit until it has been reconstituted back to full re-deployable strength. This is being addressed with the § "Associated units" training program from the Reserve and Guard.

In 2017 the National Defense Strategy and National Security Strategy and a § Sustainable Readiness Model (SRM) managed to halt the cuts. Funding was allocated for two (out of six planned) Security Force Assistance Brigades (SFABs) in 2016 composed of 529 senior officers and senior NCOs (a full chain of command for a BCT). By 2020 all 6 SFABs were activated.

The changes announced so far affect:
The number of generals and SES's will decrease 25% by 2023, DoD-wide.
FORSCOM
Every HHBN (2-star, and higher, headquarters battalion) reduces by 10%
3rd ABCT, 3rd Infantry Division, Fort Benning
2nd SBCT, 25th Infantry Division, Schofield Barracks
3rd Expeditionary Sustainment Command relocates from Fort Knox to Fort Bragg
1st Theater Sustainment Command relocates from Fort Bragg to Fort Knox
ARNG
81st Armored Brigade Combat Team, 40th Infantry Division to become an associated unit (SBCT) of 7th Infantry Division (81st's armor assets to be pre-positioned in Europe).

Brigade Combat Teams
 1st Armored Division, at Fort Bliss (Texas), regionally aligned with Central Command (CENTCOM)
 Headquarters and Headquarters Battalion
 1st Armored Brigade Combat Team, converted from Stryker BCT on 20 June 2019
 2nd Armored Brigade Combat Team
 3rd Armored Brigade Combat Team
 1st Armored Division Artillery
 Combat Aviation Brigade deploys to Afghanistan early 2019
 1st Armored Division Sustainment Brigade
 1st Cavalry Division, at Fort Hood (Texas), regionally aligned with European Command (EUCOM)
 Headquarters and Headquarters Battalion
 1st Armored Brigade Combat Team
 2nd Armored Brigade Combat Team
 3rd Armored Brigade Combat Team
 1st Cavalry Division Artillery
 Combat Aviation Brigade
 1st Cavalry Division Sustainment Brigade
 1st Infantry Division, at Fort Riley, (Kansas)
 Headquarters and Headquarters Battalion
 1st Armored Brigade Combat Team
 2nd Armored Brigade Combat Team, regionally aligned with African Command (AFRICOM)
 1st Infantry Division Artillery
 Combat Aviation Brigade
 1st Infantry Division Sustainment Brigade
 2nd Infantry Division, at Camp Humphreys, (South Korea)
 Headquarters and Headquarters Battalion
 1x Rotation Armored Brigade Combat Team, at Camp Casey, Camp Hovey, and Camp Humphreys, South Korea
 2nd Infantry Division Artillery at Camp Humphreys, (South Korea)
 Combat Aviation Brigade, at Camp Humphreys and K-16 Airfield, South Korea
 2nd Infantry Division Sustainment Brigade, at Camp Carroll, Camp Stanley, and Camp Humphreys, South Korea
 3rd Infantry Division, at Fort Stewart, (Georgia)
 Headquarters and Headquarters Battalion
 1st Armored Brigade Combat Team
 2nd Armored Brigade Combat Team
 48th Infantry Brigade Combat Team (Georgia Army National Guard)
 Task Force 1-28: 1st Battalion 28th Infantry Regiment, at Fort Benning, Georgia
 3rd Infantry Division Artillery
 Combat Aviation Brigade, at Hunter Army Airfield, Georgia
 3rd Infantry Division Sustainment Brigade
 4th Infantry Division, at Fort Carson, (Colorado), regionally aligned with European Command (EUCOM) 
 Headquarters and Headquarters Battalion
 1st Stryker Brigade Combat Team
 2nd Stryker Brigade Combat Team
 3rd Armored Brigade Combat Team
 4th Infantry Division Artillery
 Combat Aviation Brigade
 4th Infantry Division Sustainment Brigade
 7th Infantry Division (Headquarters only), at Joint Base Lewis-McChord, (Washington)
 Headquarters and Headquarters Battalion
 1st Stryker Brigade Combat Team, 2nd Infantry Division
 2nd Stryker Brigade Combat Team, 2nd Infantry Division
 81st Stryker Brigade Combat Team (Washington Army National Guard)
 10th Mountain Division, at Fort Drum, (New York)
 Headquarters and Headquarters Battalion
 1st Infantry Brigade Combat Team
 2nd Infantry Brigade Combat Team
 3rd Infantry Brigade Combat Team at Fort Polk
 10th Mountain Division Artillery
 Combat Aviation Brigade
 10th Mountain Division Sustainment Brigade
 11th Airborne Division, at Joint Base Elmendorf-Richardson, (Alaska)
 Headquarters and Headquarters Battalion
 1st Infantry Brigade Combat Team, at Fort Wainwright, (Alaska)
 2nd Infantry Brigade Combat Team (Airborne), at Joint Base Elmendorf-Richardson, (Alaska)
 11th Airborne Division Artillery
 Combat Aviation Brigade (Notional)
 Sustainment Brigade
 25th Infantry Division, at Schofield Barracks, (Hawaii)
 Headquarters and Headquarters Battalion 
 2nd Infantry Brigade Combat Team
 3rd Infantry Brigade Combat Team
 25th Infantry Division Artillery
 Combat Aviation Brigade
 25th Infantry Division Sustainment Brigade
 82nd Airborne Division, at Fort Bragg, (North Carolina)
 Headquarters and Headquarters Battalion
 1st Infantry Brigade Combat Team (Airborne)
 2nd Infantry Brigade Combat Team (Airborne)
 3rd Infantry Brigade Combat Team (Airborne)
 82nd Airborne Division Artillery
 Combat Aviation Brigade
 82nd Airborne Division Sustainment Brigade
 101st Airborne Division, at Fort Campbell, (Kentucky)
 Headquarters and Headquarters Battalion
 1st Infantry Brigade Combat Team (Air Assault)
 2nd Infantry Brigade Combat Team (Air Assault)
 3rd Infantry Brigade Combat Team (Air Assault)
 101st Airborne Division Artillery
 Combat Aviation Brigade rotates stateside early 2019
 101st Airborne Division Sustainment Brigade
 2nd Cavalry Regiment (Stryker BCT), in Vilseck, (Germany)
 3rd Cavalry Regiment (Stryker BCT), at Fort Hood, (Texas)
 173rd Airborne Brigade Combat Team, in Vicenza, (Italy)

Active-duty division:
 11 division headquarters (one division headquarters stationed overseas in South Korea)

Active-duty combat brigades: 31 at the end of 2017
 11 Armored Brigade Combat Teams
 1st, 2nd, and 3rd ABCT at Fort Bliss (Texas), part of 1st Armored Division at Fort Bliss (Texas)
 1st, 2nd, and 3rd ABCT at Fort Hood (Texas), part of 1st Cavalry Division at Fort Hood (Texas)
 1st and 2nd ABCT at Fort Riley (Kansas), part of 1st Infantry Division at Fort Riley (Kansas)
 1st and 2nd ABCT at Fort Stewart (Georgia), part of 3rd Infantry Division at Fort Stewart (Georgia)
 3rd ABCT at Fort Carson (Colorado), part of 4th Infantry Division at Fort Carson (Colorado)
 6 Stryker Brigade Combat Teams
 1st and 2nd SBCTs at Fort Carson (Colorado), part of 4th Infantry Division at Fort Carson (Colorado)
 1st and 2nd SBCT at Fort Lewis (Joint Base Lewis–McChord) (Washington), administratively under the 2nd Infantry Division at Camp Humphreys (South Korea), operationally under the 7th Infantry Division HQ at Joint Base Lewis–McChord (Washington)
 2nd Cavalry Regiment (SBCT) at Rose Barracks in Vilseck (Germany), independent SBCT under US Army Europe at Lucius D. Clay Kaserne Barracks (Germany)
 3rd Cavalry Regiment (SBCT) at Fort Hood (Texas), independent SBCT under III Corps at Fort Hood (Texas)
 6 Infantry Brigade Combat Teams (Light)
 1st and 2nd IBCT at Fort Drum (New York), part of 10th Mountain Division at Fort Drum (New York)
 3rd IBCT at Fort Polk (Louisiana), also part of 10th Mountain Division at Fort Drum (New York)
 1st IBCT at Fort Wainwright (Alaska), part of 11th Airborne Division at Joint Base Elmendorf–Richardson (Alaska)
 2nd and 3rd IBCT at Schofield Barracks (Hawaii), part of 25th Infantry Division at Schofield Barracks (Hawaii)
 5 Infantry Brigade Combat Teams (Airborne)
 1st, 2nd and 3rd IBCT (Airborne) at Fort Bragg (North Carolina), part of 82nd Airborne Division at Fort Bragg (North Carolina)
 2nd IBCT (Airborne) at Joint Base Elmendorf–Richardson (Alaska), part of 11th Airborne Division (Alaska)
 173rd Airborne Brigade Combat Team at Caserma Ederle Barracks in Vicenza (Italy), independent brigade under US Army Europe at Lucius D. Clay Kaserne Barracks (Germany)
 3 Infantry Brigade Combat Teams (Air Assault)
 1st, 2nd and 3rd IBCT (Air Assault) at Fort Campbell (Kentucky), part of 101st Airborne Division at Fort Campbell (Kentucky)

See National Guard divisions for the 27 ARNG BCTs

Support brigades
Active-duty Support Brigades (with reserve-component numbers in parenthesis: ARNG/USAR)

 12 Combat Aviation Brigades (12/2):
 12th Combat Aviation Brigade, in Katterbach, (Germany)
 16th Combat Aviation Brigade, at Joint Base Lewis-McChord, (Washington)
 10 Combat Aviation Brigades as part of active army divisions
 3 Military Intelligence Brigades (Expeditionary) (2/3):
 201st Military Intelligence Brigade, at Joint Base Lewis-McChord, (Washington)
 504th Military Intelligence Brigade, at Fort Hood, (Texas)
 525th Military Intelligence Brigade, at Fort Bragg, (North Carolina)
 5 Field Artillery Brigades (8/0):
 17th Field Artillery Brigade, at Joint Base Lewis–McChord, (Washington)
 18th Field Artillery Brigade, at Fort Bragg, (North Carolina)
 41st Field Artillety Brigade, at Grafenwoehr, (Germany)
 75th Field Artillery Brigade, at Fort Sill, (Oklahoma)
 210th Field Artillery Brigade, at Camp Casey, (South Korea)
 6 Air Defense Artillery Brigades (3/0):
 11th Air Defense Artillery Brigade, at Fort Bliss, (Texas)
 31st Air Defense Artillery Brigade, at Fort Sill, (Oklahoma)
 35th Air Defense Artillery Brigade, at Osan Air Base, (South Korea)
 38th Air Defense Artillery Brigade, at Sagami Depot, (Japan)
 52nd Air Defense Artillery Brigade, at Sembach, (Germany)
 69th Air Defense Artillery Brigade, at Fort Hood, (Texas)
 108th Air Defense Artillery Brigade, at Fort Bragg, (North Carolina)
 5 Engineer Brigades (7/4):
 7th Engineer Brigade, Ansbach, (Germany)
 20th Engineer Brigade, at Fort Bragg, (North Carolina)
 36th Engineer Brigade, at Fort Hood, (Texas)
 130th Engineer Brigade, at Schofield Barracks, (Hawaii)
 555th Engineer Brigade, at Joint Base Lewis-McChord, (Washington)
 12 Sustainment Brigades (10/9):
 16th Sustainment Brigade, in Bamberg, (Germany)
 528th Sustainment Brigade (Special Operations) (Airborne), at Fort Bragg, (North Carolina)
 Ten Sustainment Brigades as part of active army divisions
 5 Military Police Brigades (4/4):
 8th Military Police Brigade, at Schofield Barracks, (Hawaii)
 16th Military Police Brigade, at Fort Bragg, (North Carolina)
 18th Military Police Brigade, in Grafenwöhr, (Germany)
 42nd Military Police Brigade, at Joint Base Lewis-McChord, (Washington)
 89th Military Police Brigade, at Fort Hood, (Texas)
 1 Transportation Brigade (0/5):
 7th Transportation Brigade, at Fort Eustis, (Virginia)
 5 Security Force Assistance Brigades (1/0) planned, 1st in 2017:
 1st Security Force Assistance Brigade, at Fort Benning, (Georgia)
 2nd Security Force Assistance Brigade, at Fort Bragg, (North Carolina)
 3rd Security Force Assistance Brigade, at Fort Hood, (Texas)
 4th Security Force Assistance Brigade, at Fort Carson, (Colorado)
 5th Security Force Assistance Brigade, at Joint Base Lewis-McChord, (Washington)
 5 Medical Brigades (0/10):
 1st Medical Brigade, at Fort Hood, (Texas)
 30th Medical Brigade, in Sembach, (Germany)
 44th Medical Brigade, at Fort Bragg, (North Carolina)
 62nd Medical Brigade, at Joint Base Lewis-McChord, (Washington)
 65th Medical Brigade, at Camp Humphreys, (South Korea)
 9 Signal Brigades (2/2): 
 1st Signal Brigade, at Camp Humphreys, (South Korea)
 2nd Signal Brigade, in Wiesbaden, (Germany)
 11th Signal Brigade, at Fort Hood, (Texas)
 22nd Signal Brigade, at Joint Base Lewis-McChord, (Washington)
 35th Signal Brigade, at Fort Gordon, (Georgia)
 93rd Signal Brigade, at Fort Eustis, (Virginia)
 106th Signal Brigade, at Fort Sam Houston, (Texas)
 160th Signal Brigade, at Camp Arifjan, (Kuwait)
 516th Signal Brigade, at Fort Shafter, (Hawaii)
 1 Chemical Brigade (1/1): 
 48th Chemical Brigade, at Fort Hood, (Texas)

See also
 Transformation of the Army National Guard
 Revolution in Military Affairs
 Network-centric warfare

Notes

References

External links
 Blythe, Wilson C. Jr., Farrell, Dave, Jacobsen, Tim, and Owens, James. “The Battlefield Development Plan: A Holistic Campaign Assessment to Inform the Army Modernization Enterprise”, Military Review (July-August 2020), https://www.armyupress.army.mil/Journals/Military-Review/English-Edition-Archives/July-August-2020/Blythe-BDP/
 
 2007 Army Modernization Plan
 
 GlobalSecurity.org article about current transformation
 GlobalSecurity.org article about Force XXI
 Addendum D: Naming Convention for Headquarters and Forces
 John Gordon, "Transforming for What? Challenges Facing Western Militaries Today", Focus stratégique, Paris, Ifri, November 2008.
 ARFORGEN — Army Force Generation Graphic showing the three stages before deployment, discussion, ARFORGEN from Warrant Officer viewpoint, and example of training for deployment 
 Wesley, Eric J. and Blythe, Wilson C. Jr. AFC Pamphlet 71-20-1 Army Futures Command Concept for Maneuver in Multi-Domain Operations 2028, https://www.armyupress.army.mil/Portals/7/Hot-Spots/docs/NEBF/AFC-Pam-71-20-1.pdf 

21st-century history of the United States Army
Command and control
Net-centric
United States Army organization
Military reforms
BCT Modernization